= Battle of Atlanta order of battle: Confederate =

The following units and commanders fought in the Confederate Army of Tennessee during the Battle of Atlanta on July 22, 1864. The Union order of battle is listed separately. The orders of battle for the first and second phases of the campaign are listed separately as well.

== Abbreviations used ==
=== Military rank ===
- Gen = General
- LTG = Lieutenant General
- MG = Major General
- BG = Brigadier General
- Col = Colonel
- Ltc = Lieutenant Colonel
- Maj = Major
- Cpt = Captain
- Lt = Lieutenant

=== Other ===
- (w) = wounded
- (mw) = mortally wounded
- (k) = killed
- (c) = captured

== Army of Tennessee ==
Gen John B. Hood

=== Hardee's Corps ===
LTG William J. Hardee

Division	Brigade	Regiments and Others
Bate's Division; MG William B. Bate	Orphan Brigade BG Joseph H. Lewis	2nd Kentucky: Col James W. Moss; 4th Kentucky: Ltc Thomas W. Thompson; 5th Kentucky: Ltc Hiram Hawkins; 6th Kentucky: Col Martin H. Cofer; 9th Kentucky: John W. Caldwell
Bate's Division; MG William B. Bate	Florida Brigade BG Jesse J. Finley	1st-3rd Florida: Cpt Matthew Strain; 1st Florida Cavalry (dismounted)-4th Florida Infantry: Ltc Edward Badger; 6th Florida: Ltc Daniel L. Kenan; 7th Florida: Ltc Robert Bullock
Bate's Division; MG William B. Bate	Tyler's Brigade BG Thomas B. Smith	37th Georgia: Ltc Joseph T. Smith; 4th Georgia Sharpshooters Battalion: Maj Theodore D. Caswell; 15th-37th Tennessee: Ltc R. Dudley Frayser (w), Cpt Matthew Dwyer; 20th Tennessee: Ltc William M. Shy; 30th Tennessee: Ltc James J. Turner
Walker's Division; MG William H.T. Walker (k); BG Hugh W. Mercer	Gist's Brigade BG States Rights Gist (w); Col James McCullough	46th Georgia: Maj Samuel J.C. Dunlop; 8th Georgia Battalion: Ltc Zachariah L. Watters; 16th South Carolina: Col James McCullough, Cpt John W. Boling; 24th South Carolina: Col Ellison Capers (w), Ltc Jesse S. Jones
Walker's Division; MG William H.T. Walker (k); BG Hugh W. Mercer	Mercer's Brigade BG Hugh W. Mercer; Col William Barkuloo; Ltc Morgan Rawls (w); Ltc Cincinnatus S. Guyton	1st Georgia Volunteers: Col Charles H. Olmstead (w), Maj Martin J. Ford; 54th Georgia: Ltc Morgan Rawls, Cpt Thomas W. Brantley; 57th Georgia: Col William Barkuloo, Ltc Cincinnatus S. Guyton; 63rd Georgia: Maj Joseph V. H. Allen
Walker's Division; MG William H.T. Walker (k); BG Hugh W. Mercer	Stevens's Brigade Col George A. Smith (w); Col J. Cooper Nisbet (c); Col William J. Winn	1st Georgia: Cpt William J. Whitsitt; 25th Georgia: Col William J. Winn, Maj A. W. Smith; 29th Georgia: Cpt John W. Turner; 30th Georgia: Ltc James S. Boynton; 66th Georgia: Col J. Cooper Nisbet, Cpt Thomas L. Langston; 1st Georgia Sharpshooters Battalion: Maj Arthur Shaaf
Cleburne's Division; MG Patrick R. Cleburne	Govan's Brigade BG Daniel C. Govan	1st-15th Arkansas: Ltc William H. Martin (w), Cpt Felix G. Lusk; 2nd-24th Arkansas: Col Elisha Warfield (w), Ltc Eldridge G. Brasher (w), Maj Amzi T. Meek; 5th-13th Arkansas: Col John E. Murray (k), Col Peter V. Green; 6th-7th Arkansas: Col Samuel G. Smith (w) Ltc Fester J. Cameron (w), Maj William F. Douglass (w), Cpt J. T. Robinson; 8th-19th Arkansas: Col George F. Baucum (w), Ltc Anderson Watkins (k), Ltc Augustus S. Hutchinson (w), Maj David H. Hamiter; 3rd Confederate: Cpt Mumford H. Dixon
Cleburne's Division; MG Patrick R. Cleburne	Granbury's Brigade BG James A. Smith (w); Ltc Robert B. Young	7th Texas: Cpt J. William Brown; 10th Texas: Col Roger Q. Mills (w), Ltc Robert B. Young, Cpt John A. Formwalt; 6th Texas-15th Texas Cavalry (dismounted): Cpt Steven E. Rice (c), Lt Thomas L. Flynt; 17th-18th Texas Cavalry (dismounted): Cpt George D. Manion (w), Cpt William H. Perry; 24th-25th Texas Cavalry (dismounted): Maj William A. Taylor; 5th Confederate: Maj Richard J. Person (c), Cpt Aaron A. Cox
Cleburne's Division; MG Patrick R. Cleburne	Lowrey's Brigade BG Mark P. Lowrey	5th Mississippi: Ltc John B. Herring; 8th Mississippi: Col John C. Wilkinson (k), Capt H. W. Crook (w); 32nd Mississippi: Col William H. H. Tison (w); 3rd Mississippi Battalion: Ltc John D. Williams (c), Cpt Thomas P. Connor; 16th Alabama: Ltc Frederick A. Ashford; 33rd Alabama: Ltc Robert F. Crittenden; 45th Alabama: Col Harris D. Lampley (w&c) Ltc Robert H. Abercrombie
Cheatham's Division; BG George E. Maney	Maney's Brigade Col Francis M. Walker (k)	1st-27th Tennessee: Ltc John L. House; 6th-9th Tennessee: Col George C. Portor; 19th Tennessee: Maj James G. Deadrick; 50th Tennessee: Col Stephen H. Colms; 4th Confederate (Tennessee): Ltc Oliver A. Bradshaw
Cheatham's Division; BG George E. Maney	Strahl's Brigade BG Otho F. Strahl (w); Ltc James D. Tillman	4th-5th Tennessee: Maj Henry Hampton; 24th Tennessee: Col John A. Wilson (w), Ltc Samuel E. Shannon; 31st Tennessee: Ltc Fountain E. P. Stafford; 33rd Tennessee: Ltc Henry C. McNeill; 41st Tennessee: Ltc James D. Tillman, Maj T.G. Miller (w), Cpt A. M. Keith
Cheatham's Division; BG George E. Maney	Vaughan's Brigade Col Michael Magevney, Jr.	11th Tennessee: Col George W. Gordon; 12th-47th Tennessee: Col William M. Watkins; 13th-154th (Senior) Tennessee: Maj William J. Crook; 29th Tennessee: Col Horace Rice
Cheatham's Division; BG George E. Maney	Wright's Brigade Col John C. Carter	8th Tennessee: Col John H. Anderson; 16th Tennessee: Cpt Benjamin Randals; 28th Tennessee: Ltc David C. Crook; 38th Tennessee: Ltc Andrew D. Gwynne (c), Maj Hamilton W. Cotter; 51st-52nd Tennessee: Ltc John W. Estes

=== Hood's Corps ===
MG Benjamin F. Cheatham

Division	Brigade	Regiments and Others
Stevenson's Division; MG Carter L. Stevenson	Brown's Brigade Col Joseph B. Palmer	3rd Tennessee: Ltc Calvin J. Clack; 18th Tennessee: Ltc William R. Butler; 26th Tennessee: Col Richard M. Saffell; 32nd Tennessee: Cpt Thomas D. Deavenport; 45th Tennessee-23rd Tennessee Battalion: Col Anderson Searcy
Stevenson's Division; MG Carter L. Stevenson	Cumming's Brigade BG Alfred Cumming	2nd Georgia State Troops: Col James Wilson; 34th Georgia: Maj John M. Jackson; 36th Georgia: Maj Charles E. Broyles; 39th Georgia: Cpt J. W. Cureton; 56th Georgia: Col E. P. Watkins
Stevenson's Division; MG Carter L. Stevenson	Pettus's Brigade BG Edmund W. Pettus	20th Alabama: Col James M. Dedman; 23rd Alabama: Ltc Joseph B. Bibb; 30th Alabama: Col Charles M. Shelley; 31st Alabama: Maj George W. Mattison; 46th Alabama: Maj George E. Brewer
Stevenson's Division; MG Carter L. Stevenson	Reynold's Brigade BG Alexander W. Reynolds	58th North Carolina: Cpt Alfred T. Stewart; 60th North Carolina: Col Washington M. Hardy; 54th Virginia: Ltc John J. Wade; 63rd Virginia: Cpt David O. Rush
Hindman's Division; BG John C. Brown	Deas's Brigade Col John G. Coltart	19th Alabama: Ltc George R. Kimbrough; 22nd Alabama: Col Benjamin R. Hart; 25th Alabama: Cpt Napoleon B. Rouse; 39th Alabama: Ltc William C. Clifton (w), Cpt T. J. Branon; 50th Alabama: Cpt George W. Arnold; 17th Alabama Sharpshooters Battalion: Cpt James F. Nabors
Hindman's Division; BG John C. Brown	Manigault's Brigade BG Arthur Middleton Manigault	10th South Carolina: Col James F. Pressley; 19th South Carolina: Maj James L. White (w), Cpt Elijah W. Horne; 24th Alabama: Col Newton N. Davis; 28th Alabama: Ltc William L. Butler; 34th Alabama: Col Julius C. B. Mitchell
Hindman's Division; BG John C. Brown	Tucker's Brigade Col Jacob H. Sharp	7th Mississippi: Col William H. Bishop; 9th Mississippi: Ltc Benjamin F. Johns; 10th Mississippi: Ltc George B. Myers; 41st Mississippi: Col J. Byrd Williams; 44th Mississippi: Ltc R. G. Kelsey; 9th Mississippi Sharpshooters Battalion: Maj William C. Richards
Hindman's Division; BG John C. Brown	Walthall's Brigade Col Samuel Benton (mw); Col William F. Brantley	24th-27th Mississippi: Col Robert P. McKelvaine; 29th-30th Mississippi: Ltc James M. Johnson; 34th Mississippi: Cpt T. S. Hubbard
Clayton's Division; MG Henry D. Clayton	Baker's Brigade Col John H. Higley	37th Alabama: Ltc Alexander A. Greene; 40th Alabama: Maj Ezekiah S. Gulley; 42nd Alabama: Cpt Robert K. Wells; 54th Alabama: Ltc John A. Minter
Clayton's Division; MG Henry D. Clayton	Holtzclaw's Brigade Col Bush Jones	18th Alabama: Ltc Peter F. Hunley; 32nd-58th Alabama: Cpt John A. Avirett; 36th Alabama: Ltc Thomas H. Herndon; 38th Alabama: Maj Shep Ruffin (w), Lt John C. Dumas
Clayton's Division; MG Henry D. Clayton	Gibson's Brigade BG Randall L. Gibson	1st Louisiana Regulars: Cpt W. H. Sparks; 4th Louisiana: 13th Louisiana: Col Francis L. Campbell; 16th-25th Louisiana: Ltc Robert H. Lindsay; 19th Louisiana: Col Richard W. Turner; 20th Louisiana: Col Leon Von Zinken; 30th Louisiana: 14th Louisiana (Austin's) Sharpshooters Battalion: Maj Duncan Buie
Clayton's Division; MG Henry D. Clayton	Stovall's Brigade Col Abda Johnson	1st Georgia State Line: Ltc John M. Brown (mw), Cpt Albert Howell; 40th Georgia: Cpt John F. Groover; 41st Georgia: Maj Mark S. Nall; 42nd Georgia: Cpt Lovick P. Thomas; 43rd Georgia: Maj William C. Lester; 52nd Georgia: Cpt Rufus R. Asbury

=== Cavalry Corps ===
MG Joseph Wheeler

Division	Brigade	Regiments and Others
Martin's Division; MG William T. Martin	Allen's Brigade BG William Wirt Allen	1st Alabama Cavalry: Ltc D. T. Blakely; 3rd Alabama Cavalry: Col James Hagan; 4th Alabama Cavalry: Col Alfred A. Russell; 7th Alabama Cavalry: Cpt George Mason; 51st Alabama Cavalry: Col M. L. Kirkpatrick; 12th Alabama Cavalry Battalion: Cpt Warren S. Reese
Martin's Division; MG William T. Martin	Iverson's Brigade BG Alfred Iverson	1st Georgia Cavalry: Col Samuel W. Davitte; 2nd Georgia Cavalry: Col Charles C. Crews; 3rd Georgia Cavalry: Col Robert Thompson; 4th Georgia Cavalry: Col Isaac W. Avery; 6th Georgia Cavalry: Col John R. Hart
Martin's Division; MG William T. Martin	Ferguson's Brigade BG Samuel W. Ferguson	2nd Alabama Cavalry: Ltc John N. Carpenter; 53rd Alabama Cavalry: Col William Boyles; 9th Mississippi Cavalry: Col Horace H. Miller; Perrin's Mississippi Cavalry: Col Robert O. Perrin; 12th Mississippi Cavalry Battalion: Col William M. Inge

=== Georgia Militia ===
Division	Brigade	Regiments and Others
1st Division, Georgia Militia; MG Gustavus W. Smith	1st Brigade BG Reuben W. Carswell	1st Georgia Militia: Col Edward H. Pottle; 2nd Georgia Militia: Col James Stapleton; 3rd Georgia Militia: Col Q. M. Hill
1st Division, Georgia Militia; MG Gustavus W. Smith	2nd Brigade BG Pleasant J. Philips	4th Georgia Militia: Col James N. Mann; 5th Georgia Militia: Col S. S. Stafford; 6th Georgia Militia: Col J. W. Burney
1st Division, Georgia Militia; MG Gustavus W. Smith	3rd Brigade BG Charles D. Anderson	7th Georgia Militia: Col Abner Redding; 8th Georgia Militia: Col William B. Scott; 9th Georgia Militia: Col J. M. Hill
1st Division, Georgia Militia; MG Gustavus W. Smith	4th Brigade BG Henry K. McCay	10th Georgia Militia: Col C. M. Davis; 11th Georgia Militia: Col William T. Toole; 12th Georgia Militia: Col Richard Sims

== Bibliography ==
- Ecelbarger, Gary (2010). The Day Dixie Died: The Battle of Atlanta. St. Martin's Press. ISBN 978-0-312-56399-8.
