= Atlanta campaign order of battle: First phase, Confederate =

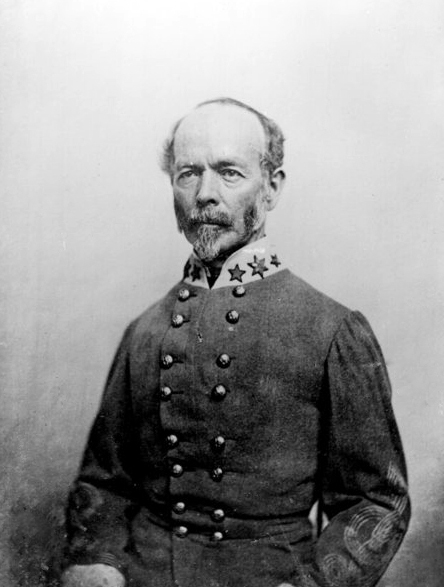
Gen Joseph E. Johnston

The following Confederate Army units and commanders fought in the Atlanta campaign of the American Civil War. The Union order of battle is listed separately. Order of battle compiled from the army organization during the campaign.

This order of battle covers the period of May 7 – July 17, 1864. The period July 17 – September 8, 1864 is listed separately.

== Abbreviations used ==
=== Military rank ===
- Gen = General
- LTG = Lieutenant General
- MG = Major General
- BG = Brigadier General
- Col = Colonel
- Ltc = Lieutenant Colonel
- Maj = Major
- Cpt = Captain
- Lt = Lieutenant

=== Other ===
- w = wounded
- k = killed

== Army of Tennessee ==
Gen Joseph E. Johnston

=== Hardee's Corps ===
LTG William J. Hardee

Division	Brigade	Regiments and others
Cheatham's Division; MG Benjamin F. Cheatham	Maney's Brigade BG George E. Maney; Col Francis M. Walker	4th Confederate (Tennessee); 1st-27th Tennessee; 6th-9th Tennessee: Col George C. Porter; 19th Tennessee (from mid-June): Col Francis M. Walker; 41st Tennessee (until mid-June); 50th Tennessee: Col Stephen H. Colms; 24th Tennessee Battalion (until early July)
Cheatham's Division; MG Benjamin F. Cheatham	Strahl's Brigade BG Otho F. Strahl	4th-5th Tennessee; 19th Tennessee (until mid-June); 24th Tennessee: Col John A. Wilson; 31st Tennessee; 33rd Tennessee; 41st Tennessee (from mid-June): Col James D. Tillman
Cheatham's Division; MG Benjamin F. Cheatham	Wright's Brigade Col John C. Carter	8th Tennessee; 16th Tennessee; 28th Tennessee; 38th Tennessee; 51st-52nd Tennessee
Cheatham's Division; MG Benjamin F. Cheatham	Vaughn's Brigade BG Alfred J. Vaughn (w July 4); Col Michael Magevney	11th Tennessee: Col George W. Gordon; 12th-47th Tennessee: Col William M. Watkins; 29th Tennessee: Col Horace Rice; 13th-154th (Senior) Tennessee: Col Michael Magevney
Cleburne's Division; MG Patrick R. Cleburne	Polk's Brigade BG Lucius E. Polk	1st-15th Arkansas: Col J. W. Colquitt; 5th Confederate (Tennessee): Cpt W. A. Brown; 2nd Tennessee (Provisional Army): Col W. D. Robison; 35th Tennessee; 48th Tennessee
Cleburne's Division; MG Patrick R. Cleburne	Govan's Brigade BG Daniel C. Govan	2nd-24th Arkansas: Col Elisha Warfield; 5th-13th Arkansas: Col John E. Murray; 6th-7th Arkansas: Col Samuel G. Smith; 8th-19th Arkansas: Col George F. Baucum; 3rd Confederate: Cpt M. H. Dixon
Cleburne's Division; MG Patrick R. Cleburne	Lowrey's Brigade BG Mark P. Lowrey	16th Alabama; 33rd Alabama: Col Samuel Adams; 45th Alabama: Col Harris D. Lampley; 32nd Mississippi: Col William H. H. Tison; 45th Mississippi
Cleburne's Division; MG Patrick R. Cleburne	Granbury's Brigade BG Hiram B. Granbury; BG James A. Smith	6th Texas Infantry-15th Texas Cavalry (dismounted): Cpt R. Fisher; 7th Texas: Cpt J. H. Collet; 10th Texas: Col Roger Q. Mills; 17th-18th Texas Cavalry (dismounted): Cpt G. D. Manion; 24th-25th Texas Cavalry (dismounted): Col F. C. Wilkes
Bate's Division; MG William B. Bate	Tyler's Brigade BG Thomas Benton Smith	37th Georgia; 10th Tennessee (until mid-June); 15th-37th Tennessee: Ltc R. Dudley Frayser (w July 22), Cpt Matthew Dwyer; 20th Tennessee; 30th Tennessee; 4th Georgia Sharpshooters
Bate's Division; MG William B. Bate	Lewis' (Orphan) Brigade BG Joseph Horace Lewis	2nd Kentucky: Col James W. Moss; 4th Kentucky; 5th Kentucky; 6th Kentucky: Col Martin H. Cofer; 9th Kentucky
Bate's Division; MG William B. Bate	Finley's Brigade BG Jesse J. Finley (w May 14); Col Angus D. McLean	1st-3rd Florida; 1st Florida Cavalry (dismounted)-4th Florida Infantry; 6th Florida: Col Angus D. McLean; 7th Florida
Walker's Division; MG William H. T. Walker	Mercer's Brigade BG Hugh W. Mercer	1st (Olmstead's) Georgia Volunteers: Col Charles H. Olmstead; 54th Georgia; 57th Georgia: Col William Barkuloo; 63rd Georgia
Walker's Division; MG William H. T. Walker	Gist's Brigade BG States Rights Gist	46th Georgia; 16th South Carolina: Col James McCullough; 24th South Carolina: Col Ellison Capers; 8th Georgia Battalion: Ltc Zachariah L. Watters
Walker's Division; MG William H. T. Walker	Jackson's Brigade BG John K. Jackson	1st Confederate (Georgia Volunteers) (until mid-June); 5th Georgia (until mid-June); 47th Georgia; 65th Georgia; 5th Mississippi; 8th Mississippi: Col John C. Wilkinson; 2nd Georgia Sharpshooters
Walker's Division; MG William H. T. Walker	Stevens' Brigade BG Clement H. Stevens	1st Confederate (Georgia Volunteers) (from mid-June); 25th Georgia: Col William J. Winn; 29th Georgia; 30th Georgia Volunteer Infantry; 66th Georgia: Col J. Cooper Nisbet; 26th Georgia Battalion (until mid-June); 1st Georgia Sharpshooters
Hardee's Corps Artillery; Col Melancthon Smith	Hoxton's Battalion Maj Llewelyn Hoxton	Phelan's (Alabama) Battery; Marion (Florida) Light Artillery; Turner's (Mississippi) Battery
Hardee's Corps Artillery; Col Melancthon Smith	Hotchkiss' Battalion Maj Thomas R. Hotchkiss	Semple's (Alabama) Battery; Key's (Arkansas) Battery: Cpt Thomas Key; Goldwaite's Alabama Battery
Hardee's Corps Artillery; Col Melancthon Smith	Martin's Battalion Maj Robert Martin	Howell's (Georgia) Battery; Bledsoe's (Missouri) Battery; Ferguson's (South Carolina) Battery
Hardee's Corps Artillery; Col Melancthon Smith	Cobb's Battalion Maj Robert Cobb	Cobb's (Kentucky) Battery; 5th Company, Washington (Louisiana) Light Artillery; Johnston (Tennessee) Light Artillery

=== Hood's Corps ===
LTG John B. Hood

Division	Brigade	Regiments and others
Hindman's Division; MG Thomas C. Hindman (w July 4); BG John C. Brown	Deas' Brigade BG Zachariah C. Deas; Col John G. Coltart	19th Alabama; 22nd Alabama: Col Benjamin R. Hart; 25th Alabama; 39th Alabama; 50th Alabama: Col John G. Coltart; 17th Alabama Sharpshooters
Hindman's Division; MG Thomas C. Hindman (w July 4); BG John C. Brown	Manigault's Brigade BG Arthur Middleton Manigault	24th Alabama: Col Newton N. Davis; 28th Alabama; 34th Alabama: Col Julius C. B. Mitchell; 10th South Carolina: Col James F. Pressley; 19th South Carolina
Hindman's Division; MG Thomas C. Hindman (w July 4); BG John C. Brown	Walthall's Brigade BG Edward C. Walthall (w May 15); Col Samuel Benton	24th-27th Mississippi: Col Robert P. McKelvaine; 29th-30th Mississippi: Col William F. Brantley; 34th Mississippi: Col Samuel Benton, Cpt T. S. Hubbard
Hindman's Division; MG Thomas C. Hindman (w July 4); BG John C. Brown	Tucker's Brigade BG William F. Tucker (w May); Col Jacob H. Sharp	7th Mississippi: Col William H. Bishop; 9th Mississippi; 10th Mississippi; 41st Mississippi: Col J. Byrd Williams; 44th Mississippi: Col Jacob H. Sharp; 9th Mississippi Sharpshooters
Stevenson's Division; MG Carter L. Stevenson	Brown's Brigade BG John C. Brown; Col Joseph B. Palmer	3rd Tennessee (Volunteers); 18th Tennessee: Col Joseph B. Palmer; 26th Tennessee: Col Richard M. Saffell; 32nd Tennessee; 45th Tennessee-23rd Tennessee Battalion: Col Anderson Searcy
Stevenson's Division; MG Carter L. Stevenson	Cumming's Brigade BG Alfred Cumming	34th Georgia; 36th Georgia; 39th Georgia; 56th Georgia: Col E. P. Watkins; 2nd Georgia State (from mid-June): Col James Wilson
Stevenson's Division; MG Carter L. Stevenson	Reynold's Brigade BG Alexander W. Reynolds (w May 27); Col Washington M. Hardy	58th North Carolina; 60th North Carolina: Col Washington M. Hardy; 54th Virginia; 63rd Virginia
Stevenson's Division; MG Carter L. Stevenson	Pettus' Brigade BG Edmund W. Pettus	20th Alabama: Col James M. Dedman; 23rd Alabama; 30th Alabama: Col Charles M. Shelley; 31st Alabama; 46th Alabama
Stewart's Division; MG Alexander P. Stewart; MG Henry D. Clayton	Stovall's Brigade BG Marcellus A. Stovall	40th Georgia; 41st Georgia; 42nd Georgia; 43rd Georgia Capt. Homer Howard; 52nd Georgia; 1st Georgia State (from mid-June)
Stewart's Division; MG Alexander P. Stewart; MG Henry D. Clayton	Clayton's Brigade BG Henry D. Clayton; BG James T. Holtzclaw	18th Alabama; 32nd-58th Alabama; 36th Alabama Col. Lewis Thompson Woodruff (w); 38th Alabama
Stewart's Division; MG Alexander P. Stewart; MG Henry D. Clayton	Gibson's Brigade BG Randall L. Gibson	1st Louisiana (Regulars); 13th-20th Louisiana Consolidated: Col Leon Von Zinken; 16th-25th Louisiana Consolidated; 19th Louisiana: Col Richard W. Turner; 4th Louisiana Battalion; 14th Louisiana Sharpshooters
Stewart's Division; MG Alexander P. Stewart; MG Henry D. Clayton	Baker's Brigade BG Alpheus Baker	37th Alabama; 40th Alabama; 42nd Alabama; 54th Alabama (from mid-June)
Hood's Corps Artillery; Col Robert F. Beckham	Courtney's Battalion Maj Alfred R. Courtney	Dent's (Alabama) Battery; Garrity's (Alabama) Battery; Douglas's Texas Battery
Hood's Corps Artillery; Col Robert F. Beckham	Eldridge's Battalion Maj John W. Eldridge	Eufala (Alabama) Artillery; Fenner's (Louisiana) Battery; Stanford's (Mississippi) Battery
Hood's Corps Artillery; Col Robert F. Beckham	Johnston's Battalion Maj John W. Johnston	Cherokee (Georgia) Artillery: Cpt Max van den Corput; Stephens (Georgia) Light Artillery: Cpt John B. Rowan; Marshall's (Tennessee) Battery

=== Polk's Corps (Army of Mississippi) ===
LTG Leonidas Polk (k June 14)
MG William W. Loring
LTG Alexander P. Stewart

Division	Brigade	Regiments and others
Loring's Division; MG William W. Loring; BG Winfield S. Featherston	Featherston's Brigade BG Winfield S. Featherston	3rd Mississippi; 22nd Mississippi; 31st Mississippi: Col Marcus Stephens; 33rd Mississippi: Col Jabez Drake; 40th Mississippi; 1st Mississippi Sharpshooters
Loring's Division; MG William W. Loring; BG Winfield S. Featherston	Adams' Brigade BG John Adams	6th Mississippi: Col Robert Lowry; 14th Mississippi; 15th Mississippi; 20th Mississippi; 23rd Mississippi; 43rd Mississippi
Loring's Division; MG William W. Loring; BG Winfield S. Featherston	Scott's Brigade BG Thomas M. Scott	27th Alabama; 35th Alabama; 49th Alabama; 55th Alabama; 57th Alabama; 12th Louisiana
French's Division; MG Samuel G. French	Ector's Brigade BG Matthew D. Ector (w July 27)	29th North Carolina; 39th North Carolina; 9th Texas: Col William Hugh Young (w); 10th Texas Cavalry (dismounted); 14th Texas Cavalry (dismounted); 32nd Texas Cavalry (dismounted)
French's Division; MG Samuel G. French	Cockrell's Brigade BG Francis M. Cockrell	1st and 4th Missouri Infantry Regiment (Consolidated); 2nd and 6th Missouri Infantry Regiment (Consolidated); 3rd and 5th Missouri Infantry Regiment (Consolidated); 1st-3rd Missouri Cavalry (dismounted): Col Elijah Gates
French's Division; MG Samuel G. French	Sears' Brigade BG Claudius W. Sears (w May 19); Col William T.S. Barry	4th Mississippi; 35th Mississippi: Col William T.S. Barry; 36th Mississippi; 39th Mississippi; 46th Mississippi; 7th Mississippi Battalion
Walthall's Division; BG James Cantey; BG Edward C. Walthall	Reynolds' Brigade BG Daniel H. Reynolds	1st Arkansas Mounted Rifles (dismounted); 2nd Arkansas Mounted Rifles (dismounted); 4th Arkansas; 9th Arkansas; 25th Arkansas
Walthall's Division; BG James Cantey; BG Edward C. Walthall	Cantey's Brigade BG James Cantey; Col Virgil Murphey	1st Alabama (from early June to mid-June); 17th Alabama: Col Virgil Murphey; 26th Alabama (from early June):Col Edward A. O'Neal; 29th Alabama; 37th Mississippi
Walthall's Division; BG James Cantey; BG Edward C. Walthall	Quarles' Brigade BG William A. Quarles	1st Alabama; 4th Louisiana; 30th Louisiana; 42nd Tennessee; 48th Tennessee; 49th Tennessee; 53rd Tennessee; 56th (46th-55th) Tennessee
Polk's Corps Artillery; Ltc Samuel C. Williams	Myrick's Battalion Maj John D. Myrick	Bouanchaud's (Louisiana) Battery: Cpt Alcide Bouanchaud; Cowan's (Mississippi) Battery; Cpt James J. Cowan; Barry's Lookout (Tennessee) Battery; Cpt Robert L. Barry
Polk's Corps Artillery; Ltc Samuel C. Williams	Storrs' Battalion Maj George S. Storrs	Ward's (Alabama) Battery; Hoskins' (Mississippi) Battery; Guibor's (Missouri) Battery
Polk's Corps Artillery; Ltc Samuel C. Williams	Preston's Battalion Maj William C. Preston (k July 20)	Tarrant's (Alabama) Battery; Selden's (Alabama) Battery; Yates' (Mississippi) Battery

=== Artillery Reserve ===
Chief of Artillery: BG Francis A. Shoup

Division	Brigade	Regiments and others
Artillery Reserve; Ltc James H. Hallonquist	Palmer's Battalion Maj Joseph Palmer	Lumsden's (Alabama) Battery; Anderson's (Georgia) Battery; Havis' (Georgia) Battery
Artillery Reserve; Ltc James H. Hallonquist	Williams' Battalion Ltc Samuel C. Williams	Barbour (Alabama) Artillery: Cpt Reuben Kolb; Jefferson (Mississippi) Artillery: Cpt Put Darden; Nottoway (Virginia) Artillery
Artillery Reserve; Ltc James H. Hallonquist	Waddell's Battalion Maj James F. Waddell	Bellamy's (Alabama) Battery; Emery's (Alabama) Battery; Barret's (Missouri) Battery: Cpt Overton Barret

=== Cavalry Corps ===
MG Joseph Wheeler

Division	Brigade	Regiments and others
Martin's Division; MG William T. Martin	Morgan's Brigade BG John T. Morgan; BG William Allen (from mid-June)	1st Alabama Cavalry; 3rd Alabama Cavalry: Col James Hagan; 4th Alabama Cavalry: Col Alfred A. Russell; 7th Alabama Cavalry; 51st Alabama Cavalry: Col Milton L. Kirkpatrick; 12th Alabama Cavalry Battalion (from mid-June)
Martin's Division; MG William T. Martin	Iverson's Brigade BG Alfred Iverson, Jr.	1st Georgia Cavalry: Col Samuel W. Davitte; 2nd Georgia Cavalry: Col Charles C. Crews; 3rd Georgia Cavalry: Col Robert Thompson; 4th Georgia Cavalry: Col Isaac W. Avery; 6th Georgia Cavalry: Col John R. Hart
Kelly's Division; BG John H. Kelly	Allen's Brigade BG William Allen (until mid-June); Col Robert H. Anderson (from mid-June)	3rd Confederate Cavalry; 8th Confederate Cavalry; 10th Confederate Cavalry; 12th Confederate Cavalry; 5th Georgia Cavalry (from mid-June): Col Robert H. Anderson
Kelly's Division; BG John H. Kelly	Dibrell's Brigade Col George G. Dibrell	4th (McLemore's) Tennessee Cavalry; 8th Tennessee Cavalry; 9th Tennessee Cavalry; 10th Tennessee Cavalry; 11th Tennessee Cavalry (until mid-June)
Humes' Division; BG William Y.C. Humes	Humes' Brigade Col James T. Wheeler; Col Henry M. Ashby (from mid-June)	1st (6th) Tennessee Cavalry: Col James T. Wheeler; 2nd (Ashby's) Tennessee Cavalry: Col Henry M. Ashby; 4th (Murray's) Tennessee Cavalry (until mid-June); 5th Tennessee Cavalry; 9th Tennessee Cavalry
Humes' Division; BG William Y.C. Humes	Grigsby's Brigade Col J. Warren Grigsby; BG John S. Williams (from mid-June)	1st (3rd) Kentucky Cavalry; 2nd Kentucky Cavalry; 9th Kentucky Cavalry; 2nd (Dortch's) Kentucky Cavalry Battalion; Hamilton's Tennessee Cavalry Battalion; Allison's Tennessee Squadron
Humes' Division; BG William Y.C. Humes	Harrison's Brigade Col Thomas H. Harrison	3rd Arkansas Cavalry; 4th (Murray's) Tennessee Cavalry (from mid-June); 8th Texas Cavalry; 11th Texas Cavalry
Humes' Division; BG William Y.C. Humes	Hannon's Brigade Col Moses W. Hannon	53rd Alabama Cavalry; 24th Alabama Cavalry Battalion
Jackson's Division; BG William H. Jackson	Armstrong's Brigade BG Frank C. Armstrong	6th Alabama Cavalry (until mid-June); 1st Mississippi Cavalry; 2nd Mississippi Cavalry; 28th Mississippi Cavalry; Ballentine's Mississippi Cavalry
Jackson's Division; BG William H. Jackson	Ross' Brigade BG Lawrence S. Ross	3rd Texas Cavalry; 6th Texas Cavalry; 9th Texas Cavalry; 27th Texas Cavalry (1st Texas Legion)
Jackson's Division; BG William H. Jackson	Ferguson's Brigade BG Samuel W. Ferguson	2nd Alabama Cavalry: Col Richard G. Earle (k May 17), Ltc John N. Carpenter; 56th Alabama Partisan Rangers: Col William Boyles; 9th Mississippi Cavalry: Col Horace H. Miller; Perrin's Mississippi Cavalry: Col Robert O. Perrin; 12th Mississippi Cavalry Battalion: Col William M. Inge
Jackson's Division; BG William H. Jackson	Waties' Battalion Cpt John Waties	Columbus (Georgia) Artillery; King's (Missouri) Battery; Waties' (South Carolina) Battery
Corps Artillery Reserve	Wheeler's Horse Artillery Ltc Felix H. Robertson	Wiggin's (Arkansas) Battery: Lt J.P. Bryant; Ferrell's (Georgia) Battery (1 section); Huggin's (Tennessee) Battery (from mid-June); Huwald's (Tennessee) Battery; White's (Tennessee) Battery

== Strengths ==
The following table shows total strengths of each of the major formations at several stages throughout the campaign.

Corps	April 30	June 10	June 30	July 10	July 31	August 10	August 31
Hardee's Corps	21,946	20,741	18,107	16,567	13,369	14,013	14,160
Hood's/Lee's Corps	21,385	17,379	15,970	15,492	13,553	13,005	11,633
Polk's/Stewart's Corps	-	16,538	14,380	13,354	11,850	11,551	11,457
Cavalry Corps	8,062	13,546	12,889	12,379	12,523	12,803	13,244
Total	52,931	69,946	62,747	59,196	51,843	51,946	51,141
