= Atlanta campaign order of battle: Second phase, Confederate =

Units in the 1864 campaign

The following Confederate Army units and commanders fought in the Atlanta campaign of the American Civil War. The Union order of battle is listed separately. Order of battle compiled from the army organization during the campaign.

This order of battle covers the second phase of the campaign, July 17 – September 8, 1864. The period May 1 – July 17, 1864 is listed separately.

== Abbreviations used ==
=== Military rank ===
- Gen = General
- LTG = Lieutenant General
- MG = Major General
- BG = Brigadier General
- Col = Colonel
- Ltc = Lieutenant Colonel
- Maj = Major
- Cpt = Captain
- Lt = Lieutenant

=== Other ===
- w = wounded
- k = killed

== Army of Tennessee ==
Gen John B. Hood

- Chief of Staff: BG William Mackall, BG Francis Shoup
- Chief of Artillery: BG Francis Shoup, Col Robert Beckham

=== Hardee's Corps ===
LTG William J. Hardee

| Division | Brigade | Regiments and Others |
|---|---|---|
| Cheatham's Division; BG George E. Maney | Maney's Brigade Col Francis M. Walker (k July 22); Col George C. Porter | 4th Confederate (34th Tennessee); 1st-27th Tennessee; 6th-9th Tennessee: Col George C. Porter; 19th Tennessee; 50th Tennessee: Col Stephen H. Colms |
| Cheatham's Division; BG George E. Maney | Strahl's Brigade BG Otho F. Strahl (w July 22); Ltc James D. Tillman | 4th-5th Tennessee; 24th Tennessee: Col John A. Wilson (w July 22), Ltc Samuel E. Shannon; 31st Tennessee; 33rd Tennessee; 41st Tennessee: Ltc James D. Tillman, Maj T.G. Miller (w July 22), Cpt A.M. Keith |
| Cheatham's Division; BG George E. Maney | Wright's Brigade BG John C. Carter | 8th Tennessee; 16th Tennessee; 28th Tennessee; 38th Tennessee: Ltc Andrew D. Gwynne (c July 22), Maj Hamilton W. Cotter; 51st-52nd Tennessee |
| Cheatham's Division; BG George E. Maney | Vaughn's Brigade Col Michael Magevney | 11th Tennessee: Col George W. Gordon; 12th-47th Tennessee: Col William M. Watkins; 13th-154th (Senior) Tennessee: Maj William J. Crook; 29th Tennessee: Col Horace Rice |
| Cleburne's Division; MG Patrick R. Cleburne | Govan's Brigade BG Daniel C. Govan | 1st-15th Arkansas: Ltc William H. Martin (w July 22), Cpt Felix G. Lusk; 2nd-24th Arkansas: Col Elisha Warfield (w July 22), Ltc Eldridge G. Brasher (w July 22), Maj Amzi T. Meek; 5th-13th Arkansas: Col John E. Murray (k July 22), Col Peter V. Green; 6th-7th Arkansas: Col Samuel G. Smith (w July 22) Ltc Fester J. Cameron (w July 22), Maj William F. Douglass (w July 22), Cpt J.T. Robinson; 8th-19th Arkansas: Col George F. Baucum (w July 22), Ltc Anderson Watkins (k July 22), Ltc Augustus S. Hutchinson (w July 22), Maj David H. Hamiter; 3rd Confederate |
| Cleburne's Division; MG Patrick R. Cleburne | Lowrey's Brigade BG Mark P. Lowrey | 16th Alabama; 33rd Alabama; 45th Alabama: Col Harris D. Lampley (w&c July 22) Ltc Robert H. Abercrombie; 5th Mississippi (from July 24); 8th Mississippi (from July 24) i: Col John C. Wilkinson (k July 22), Capt H.W. Crook (w July 22); 32nd Mississippi: Col William H. H. Tison (w July 22); 3rd Mississippi Battalion: Ltc John D. Williams (c July 22), Cpt Thomas P. Connor |
| Cleburne's Division; MG Patrick R. Cleburne | Smith's Brigade BG James A. Smith (w July 22); Ltc Robert B. Young; BG Hiram B. Granbury | 5th Confederate (Tennessee); 6th Texas Infantry-15th Texas Cavalry (dismounted); 7th Texas; 10th Texas: Col Roger Q. Mills (w July 22), Ltc Robert B. Young, Cpt John A. Formwalt; 17th-18th Texas Cavalry (dismounted); 24th-25th Texas Cavalry (dismounted) |
| Bate's Division; MG William B. Bate (w August 10); MG John C. Brown | Tyler's Brigade BG Thomas Benton Smith | 37th Georgia; 2nd Tennessee (Provisional Army); 10th Tennessee; 15th-37th Tennessee: Ltc R. Dudley Frayser (w July 22), Cpt Matthew Dwyer; 20th Tennessee; 30th Tennessee; 4th Georgia Sharpshooters |
| Bate's Division; MG William B. Bate (w August 10); MG John C. Brown | Lewis' (Orphan) Brigade BG Joseph Horace Lewis | 2nd Kentucky: Col James W. Moss; 4th Kentucky; 5th Kentucky; 6th Kentucky: Col Martin H. Cofer; 9th Kentucky |
| Bate's Division; MG William B. Bate (w August 10); MG John C. Brown | Finley's Brigade Col Angus D. McLean; Ltc Daniel Kenan | 1st-3rd Florida; 1st Florida Cavalry (dismounted)-4th Florida Infantry; 6th Florida: Ltc Daniel Kenan; 7th Florida |
| Walker's Division; MG William H. T. Walker (k July 22); BG Hugh W. Mercer | Mercer's Brigade BG Hugh W. Mercer; Col William Barkuloo; Ltc Morgan Rawls (w July 22); Ltc Cincinnatus S. Guyton; Col Charles H. Olmstead | 1st (Olmstead's) Georgia Volunteers: Col Charles H. Olmstead (w July 22), Maj Martin J. Ford; 54th Georgia: Ltc Morgan Rawls, Cpt Thomas W. Brantley; 57th Georgia: Col William Barkuloo, Ltc Cincinnatus S. Guyton; 63rd Georgia |
| Walker's Division; MG William H. T. Walker (k July 22); BG Hugh W. Mercer | Gist's Brigade BG States Rights Gist (w July 22); Col James McCullough; Col Ellison Capers | 46th Georgia; 65th Georgia; 5th Mississippi (until July 24); 8th Mississippi (until July 24); 16th South Carolina: Col James McCullough, Cpt John W. Boling; 24th South Carolina: Col Ellison Capers (w July 22), Ltc Jesse S. Jones; 8th Georgia Battalion: Ltc Zachariah L. Watters; 2nd Georgia Sharpshooters |
| Walker's Division; MG William H. T. Walker (k July 22); BG Hugh W. Mercer | Stevens' Brigade BG Clement H. Stevens (mw July 20); Col George A. Smith (w July 22); Col J. Cooper Nisbet (c July 22); Col William J. Winn; BG Henry R. Jackson | 1st Confederate (Georgia Volunteers); 25th Georgia: Col William J. Winn, Maj A.W. Smith; 29th Georgia; 30th Georgia; 66th Georgia: Col J. Cooper Nisbet, Cpt Thomas L. Langston; 1st Georgia Sharpshooters |
| Hardee's Corps Artillery; Col Melancthon Smith | Palmer's Battalion Maj Joseph Palmer | Lumsden's (Alabama) Battery; Anderson's (Georgia) Battery; Havis' (Georgia) Battery |
| Hardee's Corps Artillery; Col Melancthon Smith | Hoxton's Battalion Maj Llewelyn Hoxton | Phelan's (Alabama) Battery; Marion (Florida) Light Artillery; Turner's (Mississippi) Battery |
| Hardee's Corps Artillery; Col Melancthon Smith | Hotchkiss' Battalion Maj Thomas R. Hotchkiss; Cpt Thomas Key | Semple's (Alabama) Battery; Key's (Arkansas) Battery: Cpt Thomas Key; Warren (Mississippi) Light Artillery |
| Hardee's Corps Artillery; Col Melancthon Smith | Martin's Battalion Maj Robert Martin | Howell's (Georgia) Battery; Bledsoe's (Missouri) Battery; Ferguson's (South Carolina) Battery |
| Hardee's Corps Artillery; Col Melancthon Smith | Cobb's Battalion Maj Robert Cobb | Cobb's (Kentucky) Battery; 5th Company, Washington (Louisiana) Light Artillery; Johnston (Tennessee) Light Artillery |

=== Lee's Corps ===
MG Carter L. Stevenson
MG Benjamin F. Cheatham
LTG Stephen D. Lee

| Division | Brigade | Regiments and Others |
|---|---|---|
| Anderson's Division; MG Patton Anderson | Deas' Brigade Col John G. Coltart; BG Zachariah C. Deas | 19th Alabama; 22nd Alabama: Col Benjamin R. Hart; 25th Alabama; 39th Alabama: Ltc William C. Clifton (w July 22), Cpt T. J. Branon; 50th Alabama: Col John G. Coltart, Cpt George W. Arnold; 17th Alabama Sharpshooters (until mid-August) |
| Anderson's Division; MG Patton Anderson | Manigault's Brigade BG Arthur Middleton Manigault | 24th Alabama: Col Newton N. Davis; 28th Alabama; 34th Alabama: Col Julius C. B. Mitchell; 10th South Carolina: Col James F. Pressley; 19th South Carolina: Maj James L. White (w July 22), Cpt Elijah W. Horne |
| Anderson's Division; MG Patton Anderson | Brantley's Brigade Col Samuel Benton (mw July 22); Col William F. Brantley | 24th-27th Mississippi: Col Robert P. McKelvaine; 29th-30th Mississippi: Col William F. Brantley, Ltc James M. Johnson; 34th Mississippi: Cpt T. S. Hubbard |
| Anderson's Division; MG Patton Anderson | Sharp's Brigade BG Jacob H. Sharp | 7th Mississippi: Col William H. Bishop; 9th Mississippi; 10th Mississippi; 41st Mississippi: Col J. Byrd Williams; 44th Mississippi; 9th Mississippi Sharpshooters |
| Stevenson's Division; MG Carter L. Stevenson | Brown's Brigade BG John C. Brown; Col Joseph B. Palmer (w September 1) | 3rd Tennessee (Volunteers); 18th Tennessee: Col Joseph B. Palmer; 26th Tennessee: Col Richard M. Saffell; 32nd Tennessee; 45th Tennessee-23rd Tennessee Battalion: Col Anderson Searcy |
| Stevenson's Division; MG Carter L. Stevenson | Cumming's Brigade BG Alfred Cumming | 34th Georgia; 36th Georgia; 39th Georgia; 56th Georgia: Col E. P. Watkins; 2nd Georgia State: Col James Wilson |
| Stevenson's Division; MG Carter L. Stevenson | Reynold's Brigade Col Washington M. Hardy | 58th North Carolina; 60th North Carolina; 54th Virginia; 63rd Virginia |
| Stevenson's Division; MG Carter L. Stevenson | Pettus' Brigade BG Edmund W. Pettus | 20th Alabama: Col James M. Dedman; 23rd Alabama; 30th Alabama: Col Charles M. Shelley; 31st Alabama; 46th Alabama |
| Clayton's Division; MG Henry D. Clayton | Stovall's Brigade BG Marcellus A. Stovall | 40th Georgia; 41st Georgia; 42nd Georgia; 43rd Georgia; 52nd Georgia; 1st Georgia State: Ltc John M. Brown (mw July 22), Cpt Albert Howell |
| Clayton's Division; MG Henry D. Clayton | Holtzclaw's Brigade BG James T. Holtzclaw | 18th Alabama; 32nd-58th Alabama; 36th Alabama; 38th Alabama: Maj Shep Ruffin (w July 22), Lt John C. Dumas |
| Clayton's Division; MG Henry D. Clayton | Gibson's Brigade BG Randall L. Gibson | 1st Louisiana (Regulars); 4th Louisiana; 13th-20th Louisiana: Col Leon Von Zinken; 16th-25th Louisiana; 19th Louisiana: Col Richard W. Turner; 30th Louisiana; 4th Louisiana Battalion; 14th Louisiana Sharpshooters |
| Clayton's Division; MG Henry D. Clayton | Baker's Brigade BG Alpheus Baker | 37th Alabama; 40th Alabama; 42nd Alabama; 54th Alabama |
| Lee's Corps Artillery; Ltc James H. Hallonquist | William's Battalion Ltc Samuel C. Williams; Cpt Reuben Kolb | Barbour (Alabama) Artillery: Cpt Reuben Kolb; Jefferson (Mississippi) Artillery; Nottoway (Virginia) Artillery |
| Lee's Corps Artillery; Ltc James H. Hallonquist | Courtney's Battalion Maj Alfred R. Courtney | Dent's (Alabama) Battery; Garrity's (Alabama) Battery; Douglas's Texas Battery |
| Lee's Corps Artillery; Ltc James H. Hallonquist | Eldridge's Battalion Maj John W. Eldridge | Eufala (Alabama) Artillery; Fenner's (Louisiana) Battery; Stanford's (Mississippi) Battery |
| Lee's Corps Artillery; Ltc James H. Hallonquist | Johnston's Battalion Maj John W. Johnston; Cpt John B. Rowan | Cherokee (Georgia) Artillery: Cpt Max van den Corput; Stephens (Georgia) Light Artillery: John B. Rowan; Marshall's (Tennessee) Battery |

=== Stewart's Corps ===
LTG Alexander P. Stewart (w July 28)
MG Benjamin F. Cheatham

| Division | Brigade | Regiments and Others |
|---|---|---|
| Loring's Division; MG William W. Loring (w July 28); BG Winfield S. Featherston | Featherston's Brigade BG Winfield S. Featherston; Col Robert Lowry; Col Marcus Stephens | 1st Mississippi; 3rd Mississippi; 22nd Mississippi; 31st Mississippi: Col Marcus Stephens; 33rd Mississippi: Col Jabez Drake; 40th Mississippi; 1st Mississippi Sharpshooters |
| Loring's Division; MG William W. Loring (w July 28); BG Winfield S. Featherston | Adams' Brigade BG John Adams | 6th Mississippi: Col Robert Lowry; 14th Mississippi; 15th Mississippi; 20th Mississippi; 23rd Mississippi; 43rd Mississippi |
| Loring's Division; MG William W. Loring (w July 28); BG Winfield S. Featherston | Scott's Brigade BG Thomas M. Scott | 27th-35th-49th Alabama; 55th Alabama; 57th Alabama; 12th Louisiana |
| French's Division; MG Samuel G. French | Ector's Brigade Col William H. Young | 29th North Carolina; 39th North Carolina; 9th Texas; 10th Texas Cavalry (dismounted); 14th Texas Cavalry (dismounted); 32nd Texas Cavalry (dismounted) |
| French's Division; MG Samuel G. French | Cockrell's (First Missouri) Brigade Col Elijah Gates | 1st-4th Missouri; 2nd-6th Missouri; 3rd-5th Missouri; 1st-3rd Missouri Cavalry (dismounted) |
| French's Division; MG Samuel G. French | Sears' Brigade Col William T.S. Barry; BG Claudius W. Sears | 4th Mississippi; 35th Mississippi: Col William T.S. Barry; 36th Mississippi; 39th Mississippi; 46th Mississippi; 7th Mississippi Battalion |
| Walthall's Division; MG Edward C. Walthall | Reynolds' Brigade BG Daniel H. Reynolds | 1st Arkansas Mounted Rifles (dismounted); 2nd Arkansas Mounted Rifles (dismounted); 4th Arkansas; 9th Arkansas; 25th Arkansas |
| Walthall's Division; MG Edward C. Walthall | Cantey's Brigade Col Edward A. O'Neal | 17th Alabama: Col Virgil Murphey; 26th Alabama; 29th Alabama; 37th Mississippi |
| Walthall's Division; MG Edward C. Walthall | Quarles' Brigade BG William A. Quarles | 1st Alabama; 42nd Tennessee; 48th Tennessee; 49th Tennessee; 53rd Tennessee; 56th (46th-55th) Tennessee |
| Stewart's Corps Artillery; Ltc Samuel C. Williams | Myrick's Battalion Maj John D. Myrick | Bouanchaud's (Louisiana) Battery: Cpt Alcide Bouanchaud; Cowan's (Mississippi) Battery; Barry's Lookout (Tennessee) Battery |
| Stewart's Corps Artillery; Ltc Samuel C. Williams | Storrs' Battalion Maj George S. Storrs | Ward's (Alabama) Battery; Hoskins' (Mississippi) Battery; Guibor's (Missouri) Battery |
| Stewart's Corps Artillery; Ltc Samuel C. Williams | Preston's Battalion Maj William C. Preston | Tarrant's (Alabama) Battery; Selden's (Alabama) Battery; Yates' (Mississippi) Battery |
| Stewart's Corps Artillery; Ltc Samuel C. Williams | Waddell's Battalion Maj James F. Waddell; Cpt Overton Barret | Bellamy's (Alabama) Battery; Emery's (Alabama) Battery; Barret's (Missouri) Battery: Cpt Overton Barret |

=== Cavalry Corps ===
MG Joseph Wheeler

| Division | Brigade | Regiments and Others |
|---|---|---|
| Martin's Division; MG William T. Martin | Allen's Brigade BG William Allen | 1st Alabama Cavalry; 3rd Alabama Cavalry: Col James Hagan; 4th Alabama Cavalry: Col Alfred A. Russell; 7th Alabama Cavalry; 51st Alabama Cavalry: Col Milton L. Kirkpatrick; 12th Alabama Cavalry Battalion |
| Martin's Division; MG William T. Martin | Iverson's Brigade BG Alfred Iverson, Jr. | 1st Georgia Cavalry: Col Samuel W. Davitte; 2nd Georgia Cavalry: Col Charles C. Crews; 3rd Georgia Cavalry: Col Robert Thompson; 4th Georgia Cavalry: Col Isaac W. Avery; 6th Georgia Cavalry: Col John R. Hart |
| Kelly's Division; BG John H. Kelly | Anderson's Brigade BG Robert H. Anderson | 3rd Confederate Cavalry; 8th Confederate Cavalry; 10th Confederate Cavalry; 12th Confederate Cavalry; 5th Georgia Cavalry |
| Kelly's Division; BG John H. Kelly | Dibrell's Brigade Col George G. Dibrell | 4th (McLemore's) Tennessee Cavalry; 8th Tennessee Cavalry; 9th Tennessee Cavalry; 10th Tennessee Cavalry; 11th Tennessee Cavalry |
| Kelly's Division; BG John H. Kelly | Hannon's Brigade Col Moses W. Hannon | 53rd Alabama Cavalry; 24th Alabama Cavalry Battalion |
| Kelly's Division; BG John H. Kelly | Williams' Brigade BG John S. Williams | 1st (3rd) Kentucky Cavalry; 2nd Kentucky Cavalry; 9th Kentucky Cavalry; 2nd (Dortch's) Kentucky Cavalry Battalion; Hamilton's Tennessee Cavalry Battalion; Allison's Tennessee Squadron |
| Humes' Division; BG William Y.C. Humes | Ashby's Brigade Col Henry M. Ashby (from mid-June) | 1st (6th) Tennessee Cavalry: Col James T. Wheeler; 2nd (Ashby's) Tennessee Cavalry; 5th Tennessee Cavalry; 9th Tennessee Cavalry |
| Humes' Division; BG William Y.C. Humes | Harrison's Brigade Col Thomas H. Harrison | 3rd Arkansas Cavalry; 4th (Murray's) Tennessee Cavalry; 8th Texas Cavalry; 11th Texas Cavalry |
| Jackson's Division; BG William Hicks Jackson | Armstrong's Brigade BG Frank C. Armstrong | 1st Mississippi Cavalry; 2nd Mississippi Cavalry; 28th Mississippi Cavalry; Ballentine's Mississippi Cavalry |
| Jackson's Division; BG William Hicks Jackson | Ross' Brigade BG Lawrence Sullivan Ross | 3rd Texas Cavalry; 6th Texas Cavalry; 9th Texas Cavalry; 27th Texas Cavalry (1st Texas Legion) |
| Jackson's Division; BG William Hicks Jackson | Ferguson's Brigade BG Samuel W. Ferguson | 2nd Alabama Cavalry: Ltc John N. Carpenter; 56th Alabama Partisan Rangers: Col William Boyles; 9th Mississippi Cavalry: Col Horace H. Miller; Perrin's Mississippi Cavalry: Col Robert O. Perrin; 12th Mississippi Cavalry Battalion: Col William M. Inge |
| Jackson's Division; BG William Hicks Jackson | Waties' Battalion Cpt John Waties | Columbus (Georgia) Artillery; King's (Missouri) Battery; Waties' (South Carolina) Battery |
| Corps Artillery Reserve | Wheeler's Horse Artillery Ltc Felix H. Robertson | Wiggin's (Arkansas) Battery: Lt J.P. Bryant; Ferrell's (Georgia) Battery (1 section); Huggin's (Tennessee) Battery; Huwald's (Tennessee) Battery; White's (Tennessee) Battery |

== Strengths ==
The following table shows total strengths of each of the major formations at several stages throughout the campaign.

| Corps | April 30 | June 10 | June 30 | July 10 | July 31 | August 10 | August 31 |
|---|---|---|---|---|---|---|---|
| Hardee's Corps | 21,946 | 20,741 | 18,107 | 16,567 | 13,369 | 14,013 | 14,160 |
| Hood's/Lee's Corps | 21,385 | 17,379 | 15,970 | 15,492 | 13,553 | 13,005 | 11,633 |
| Polk's/Stewart's Corps | - | 16,538 | 14,380 | 13,354 | 11,850 | 11,551 | 11,457 |
| Cavalry Corps | 8,062 | 13,546 | 12,889 | 12,379 | 12,523 | 12,803 | 13,244 |
| Total | 52,931 | 69,946 | 62,747 | 59,196 | 51,843 | 51,946 | 51,141 |
