= Battle of Franklin order of battle: Confederate =

The following Confederate States Army units and commanders fought in the Battle of Franklin on November 30, 1864. The Union order of battle is shown separately.

== Abbreviations used ==
=== Military rank ===
- Gen = General
- LTG = Lieutenant General
- MG = Major General
- BG = Brigadier General
- Col = Colonel
- Ltc = Lieutenant Colonel
- Maj = Major
- Cpt = Captain
- Lt = Lieutenant

=== Other ===
- w = wounded
- mw = mortally wounded
- k = killed
- c = captured
- m = missing

== Army of Tennessee ==
Gen John B. Hood, Commanding

=== Cheatham's Corps ===
MG Benjamin F. Cheatham

Division	Brigade	Regiments and Others
Cleburne's Division; MG Patrick Cleburne (k); BG James A. Smith	Lowrey's Brigade BG Mark P. Lowrey	16th Alabama: Col Frederick A. Ashford (k); 33rd Alabama: Col Robert F. Crittenden (c); 45th Alabama: Ltc Robert H. Abercrombie (w); 5th Mississippi-3rd Mississippi Battalion: Col John Weir (w), Cpt Francis M. Woodward; 8th-32nd Mississippi: Col William H. H. Tison (w), Maj Andrew E. Moody
Cleburne's Division; MG Patrick Cleburne (k); BG James A. Smith	Govan's Brigade BG Daniel C. Govan	1st-15th Arkansas: Cpt Mordecai P. Garrett (k), Cpt Alfred C. Hockersmith; 2nd-24th Arkansas: Maj Amzi T. Meek (k); 5th-13th Arkansas: Col Peter V. Green; 6th-7th Arkansas: Col Peter Snyder; 8th-19th Arkansas: Maj. David H. Hamiter; 3rd Confederate: Cpt Mumford H. Dixon (c)
Cleburne's Division; MG Patrick Cleburne (k); BG James A. Smith	Granbury's Brigade BG Hiram B. Granbury (k); Cpt Edward T. Broughton	5th Confederate: Cpt Aaron A. Cox (w); 35th Tennessee; 6th-15th Texas: Maj S. Rhoads Fisher (c), Cpt Benjamin R. Tyus; 7th Texas: Cpt Edward T. Broughton, Cpt James W. Brown (c), Cpt Orren P. Forrest; 10th Texas: Ltc Robert B. Young (k), Cpt Reuben D. Kennedy; 17th-18th Texas Cavalry (dismounted); 24th-25th Texas Cavalry (dismounted): Maj William A. Taylor (c); Nutt's Louisiana Cavalry (dismounted): Cpt Leroy M. Nutt
Cleburne's Division; MG Patrick Cleburne (k); BG James A. Smith	Smith's Brigade (Absent guarding army supply train) BG James A. Smith; Col Charles H. Olmstead	1st Georgia Volunteers: Col Charles H. Olmstead, Maj Martin J. Ford; 54th Georgia: Cpt George W. Moody; 57th Georgia: Cpt Lucius C. Bryan; 63rd Georgia: Cpt Elijah J. Craven
Brown's (Cheatham's Old) Division; MG John C. Brown (w); BG Mark P. Lowrey	Gist's Brigade BG States Rights Gist (k); Ltc Zachariah L. Watters	46th Georgia: Maj Samuel J.C. Dunlop (w), Cpt Malcolm Gillis; 65th&8th Georgia: Ltc Zachariah L. Watters; 2nd Georgia Sharpshooters Battalion; 16th South Carolina: Maj B. Burgh Smith; 24th South Carolina: Col Ellison Capers (w), Cpt William C. Griffith
Brown's (Cheatham's Old) Division; MG John C. Brown (w); BG Mark P. Lowrey	Maney's Brigade BG John C. Carter (mw); Col Hume R. Field	1st-27th Tennessee: Col Hume R. Field; 34th Tennessee; 6th-9th Tennessee; 8th Tennessee: Col John H. Anderson; 16th Tennessee: Maj Benjamin Randals; 28th Tennessee: Cpt John B. Holman (k); 50th Tennessee: Ltc George W. Pease
Brown's (Cheatham's Old) Division; MG John C. Brown (w); BG Mark P. Lowrey	Strahl's Brigade BG Otho F. Strahl (k); Col Andrew J. Kellar	4th-5th Tennessee: Col Andrew J. Kellar, Ltc Luke W. Finlay; 19th Tennessee: Cpt Daniel A. Kennedy; 24th Tennessee: Col John A. Wilson (w); 31st Tennessee: Ltc Fountain E.P. Stafford (k); 33rd Tennessee; 38th Tennessee; 41st Tennessee: Acting Maj Anthony M. Keith (w)
Brown's (Cheatham's Old) Division; MG John C. Brown (w); BG Mark P. Lowrey	Vaughan's Brigade BG George W. Gordon (c); Col William M. Watkins	11th Tennessee: Maj John E. Binns; 12th-47th Tennessee: Col William M. Watkins, Cpt Charles N. Wade; 13th-154th (Senior) Tennessee: Col Michael Magevney (w); 29th Tennessee: Col Horace Rice (w&c); 51st-52nd Tennessee: Maj John T. Williamson
Bate's Division; MG William B. Bate	Tyler's Brigade BG Thomas B. Smith	37th Georgia; 4th Georgia Sharpshooters Battalion: Maj Theodore D. Caswell; 2nd Tennessee; 10th-30th Tennessee; 20th Tennessee: Col William M. Shy; 15th-37th Tennessee
Bate's Division; MG William B. Bate	Finley's Brigade Col Robert Bullock (w); Maj Jacob A. Lash	1st-3rd Florida: Cpt Matthew H. Strain; 4th Florida & 1st Florida Cavalry (dismounted): Ltc Edward Badger (w), Maj Jacob A. Lash; 6th Florida; 7th Florida
Bate's Division; MG William B. Bate	Jackson's Brigade BG Henry R. Jackson	1st Confederate (Georgia): Col George A. Smith (k), Ltc James C. Gordon; 25th Georgia: Col William D. Mitchell; 29th Georgia; 30th Georgia; 66th Georgia: Ltc Algernon S. Hamilton (w); 1st Georgia Sharpshooters Battalion
Corps Artillery; Col Melancthon Smith	Hoxton's Battalion Ltc Llewellyn G. Hoxton	Phelan's Alabama Battery; Perry's Florida Battery; Turner's Miss Battery
Corps Artillery; Col Melancthon Smith	Hotchkiss's Battalion	Goldthwaite's Alabama Battery (Present and engaged); Key's Arkansas Battery; Bledsoe's Missouri Battery
Corps Artillery; Col Melancthon Smith	Hoxton's Battalion Cpt Rene T. Beauregard	Slocumb's Louisiana Battery: Lt Joseph E. Chalaron; Ferguson's South Carolina Battery; Phillip's (Mabane's) Tennessee Battery

=== Lee's Corps ===
LTG Stephen D. Lee

Division	Brigade	Regiments and Others
Johnson's Division; MG Edward Johnson	Deas's Brigade BG Zachariah C. Deas (w)	19th Alabama: Ltc George R. Kimbrough; 22nd Alabama: Maj Edward H. Armistead (mw), Cpt Hugh W. Henry; 25th Alabama: Cpt Napoleon B. Routh; 39th Alabama: Ltc William C. Clifton; 50th Alabama: Col John G. Coltart
Johnson's Division; MG Edward Johnson	Manigault's Brigade BG Arthur M. Manigault (w); Ltc William L. Butler	24th Alabama: Col Newton N. Davis (w), Cpt Thomas J. Kimbell; 28th Alabama: Ltc William L. Butler; 34th Alabama: Col John C. Carter; 10th South Carolina: Ltc C. Irvine Walker; 19th South Carolina: Col Thomas P. Shaw (w&c), Cpt Thomas W. Getzen
Johnson's Division; MG Edward Johnson	Sharp's Brigade BG Jacob H. Sharp (w)	7th-9th Mississippi: Col William H. Bishop (k), Maj Henry Pope; 10th-44th Mississippi & 9th Battalion: Col William H. Sims (w), Cpt Robert A. Bell; 41st Mississippi: Cpt James M. Hicks (w)
Johnson's Division; MG Edward Johnson	Brantley's Brigade BG William F. Brantley	24th-34th Mississippi: Cpt Clifton Dancy; 27th Mississippi: Cpt Samuel M. Pegg; 29th Mississippi: Maj George W. Reynolds (k); 30th Mississippi: Ltc James M. Johnson (w), Maj John K. Allen (m), Cpt Robert W. Williamson; Dismounted Cavalry Company: Cpt D.W. Alexander
Stevenson's Division; MG Carter L. Stevenson	Cummings's Brigade Col Elihu P. Watkins	34th Georgia: Cpt Russell A. Jones; 36th Georgia: Col Charles E. Broyles; 39th Georgia: Cpt William P. Milton; 56th Georgia: Cpt Benjamin T. Spearman
Stevenson's Division; MG Carter L. Stevenson	Pettus's Brigade BG Edmund W. Pettus	20th Alabama: Col James M. Dedman; 23rd Alabama: Ltc Joseph B. Bibb; 30th Alabama: Ltc James K. Elliott; 31st Alabama: Ltc Thomas M. Arrington; 46th Alabama: Cpt George E. Brewer
Stevenson's Division; MG Carter L. Stevenson	Brown's and Reynolds' consolidated Brigade (Absent guarding army ordnance train) BG Joseph B. Palmer	58th North Carolina; 60th North Carolina: Maj James T. Huff; 3rd-18th Tennessee: Ltc William R. Butler; 23rd-26th-45th Tennessee: Col Anderson Searcy; 32nd Tennessee: Col John P. McGuire; 54th Virginia Infantry: Cpt William G. Anderson; 63rd Virginia Infantry: Ltc Connally H. Lynch
Clayton's Division; MG Henry D. Clayton, Sr.	Stovall's Brigade BG Marcellus A. Stovall	40th Georgia: Col Abda Johnson; 41st Georgia: Cpt Jared E. Stallings; 42nd Georgia: Col Robert J. Henderson; 43rd Georgia: Col Henry C. Kellogg; 52nd Georgia: Cpt Rufus R. Asbury
Clayton's Division; MG Henry D. Clayton, Sr.	Gibson's Brigade BG Randall L. Gibson	1st Louisiana: Cpt Samuel Sutter; 4th Louisiana: Col Samuel E. Hunter (c); 13th-20th Louisiana: Ltc Francis L. Campbell; 16th-25th Louisiana: Ltc Robert H. Lindsay; 19th Louisiana: Maj Camp Flournoy; 30th Louisiana: Maj Arthur Picolet; 4th Louisiana Battalion: Maj Duncan Buie; 14th Louisiana Sharpshooters Battalion: Cpt William Q. Lowd
Clayton's Division; MG Henry D. Clayton, Sr.	Holtzclaw's Brigade BG James T. Holtzclaw	18th Alabama: Ltc Peter F. Hunley; 32nd-58th Alabama: Col Bushrod Jones; 36th Alabama: Cpt Nathan M. Carpenter; 38th Alabama: Maj Harry I. Thornton
Corps Artillery; Col Robert F. Beckham (mw); Maj John W. Johnston	Courtney's Battalion Cpt James Postell Douglas	Dent's (Alabama) Battery: Cpt Stouten H. Dent; Douglas's (Texas) Battery: Lt Benjamin Hardin; Garrity's (Alabama) Battery: Lt Henry F. Carrell
Corps Artillery; Col Robert F. Beckham (mw); Maj John W. Johnston	Eldridge's Battalion Cpt Charles E. Fenner	McKenzie's (Alabama) Battery: Cpt William J. McKenzie; Fenner's (Louisiana) Battery: Lt Wat T. Cluverius; Stanford's (Mississippi) Battery: Lt James S. McCall
Corps Artillery; Col Robert F. Beckham (mw); Maj John W. Johnston	Johnston's Battalion Maj John W. Johnston; Cpt John B. Rowan	Corput's (Georgia) Battery: Lt William S. Hoge; Marshall's (Tennessee) Battery: Cpt Lucius G. Marshall; Rowan's (Georgia/Maryland) Battery: Cpt John B. Rowan, Lt William L. Ritter

=== Stewart's Corps ===
LTG Alexander P. Stewart

Division	Brigade	Regiments and Others
Loring's Division; MG William W. Loring	Featherston's Brigade BG Winfield S. Featherston	1st Mississippi: Cpt Owen D. Hughes; 3rd Mississippi: Ltc Samuel M. Dyer (w), Cpt O. H. Johnston; 22nd Mississippi: Maj Martin A. Oatis; 31st Mississippi: Col Marcus D.L. Stephens (w), Cpt Robert A. Collins; 33rd Mississippi; 40th Mississippi: Col Wallace B. Colbert; 1st Mississippi Battalion: Maj James M. Stigler
Loring's Division; MG William W. Loring	Adams's Brigade BG John Adams (k); Col Robert Lowry	6th Mississippi: Col Robert Lowry, Ltc Thomas J. Borden; 14th Mississippi: Col Washington L. Doss; 15th Mississippi: Col Michael Ferrell (mw), Ltc James R. Binford; 20th Mississippi: Col William N. Brown (w), Ltc Walter A. Rorer (mw), Maj Thomas B. Graham (w); 23rd Mississippi; 43rd Mississippi: Col Richard Harrison
Loring's Division; MG William W. Loring	Scott's Brigade BG Thomas M. Scott (w); Col John Snodgrass	27th-35th-49th Alabama: Col Samuel S. Ives (w), Ltc John D. Weeden; 55th Alabama: Col John Snodgrass, Maj James B. Dickey; 57th Alabama: Col Columbus J.L. Cunningham (w), Maj J. Horatio Wiley; 12th Louisiana: Col Noel L. Nelson (k), Cpt James T. Davis
French's Division; MG Samuel G. French	Ector's Brigade (Absent guarding pontoon bridges) Col David Coleman	29th North Carolina: Maj Ezekiel H. Hampton; 39th North Carolina: Cpt James G. Crawford; 9th Texas: Maj James H. McReynolds; 10th Texas Cavalry (dismounted): Col Cullin R. Earp; 14th Texas Cavalry (dismounted): Cpt Robert H. Harkey; 32nd Texas Cavalry (dismounted): Maj William E. Estes
French's Division; MG Samuel G. French	Cockrell's Brigade BG Francis M. Cockrell (w); Col Peter C. Flournoy	1st-4th Missouri: Col Hugh A. Garland (k), Cpt James H. Wickersham; 2nd-6th Missouri: Col Peter C. Flournoy, Ltc William F. Carter (w), Ltc Stephen Cooper; 3rd-5th Missouri: Cpt Patrick Canniff (k); 1st-3rd Missouri Cavalry (dismounted): Col Elijah Gates (w)
French's Division; MG Samuel G. French	Sears's Brigade BG Claudius Sears	4th Mississippi: Col Thomas N. Adaire (w); 35th Mississippi: Ltc Reuben H. Shotwell; 36th Mississippi: Col William W. Witherspoon (k); 39th Mississippi; 46th Mississippi: Ltc Turpin D. Magee (w); 7th Mississippi Battalion
Walthall's Division; MG Edward C. Walthall	Quarles's Brigade BG William A. Quarles (w); BG George D. Johnston	1st Alabama: Maj Samuel L. Knox (w&c); 42nd Tennessee: Col Isaac N. Hulme (w); 46th Tennessee: Maj Sylvester C. Cooper (w&c); 48th Tennessee: Capt Henry G. Evans; 49th Tennessee: Ltc Thomas M. Atkins (w&c); 53rd Tennessee: Cpt Issac J. Rittenbury (w&c); 55th (Brown's) Tennessee: Maj Joseph E. McDonald (k)
Walthall's Division; MG Edward C. Walthall	Cantey's Brigade BG Charles M. Shelley	17th Alabama: Col Virgil S. Murphy (m); 26th Alabama: Ltc John S. Garvin (w); 29th Alabama: Cpt Alfred V. Gardner (w); 37th Mississippi: Maj Samuel H. Terral
Walthall's Division; MG Edward C. Walthall	Reynolds' Brigade BG Daniel H. Reynolds	1st Arkansas Mounted Rifles (dismounted): Cpt Robert P. Parks; 2nd Arkansas Mounted Rifles (dismounted): Maj James P. Eagle; 4th Arkansas: Maj Jesse A. Ross; 9th Arkansas: Maj John C. Bratton (w), Cpt William L. Phifer; 25th Arkansas
Corps Artillery; Ltc Samuel C. Williams	Truehart's Battalion	Lumsden's Alabama Battery; Selden's Alabama Battery
Corps Artillery; Ltc Samuel C. Williams	Myrick's Battalion (arrived early next morning)	Bouanchaud's Louisiana Battery; Cowan's Miss Battery; Darden's Miss Battery
Corps Artillery; Ltc Samuel C. Williams	Storrs' Battalion	Guibor's Missouri Battery (Present and engaged); Hoskin's Miss Battery; Kolb's Alabama Battery

=== Cavalry Corps ===
MG Nathan B. Forrest

Division	Brigade	Regiments and Others
Chalmers' Division; BG James R. Chalmers	Rucker's Brigade Col Edmund W. Rucker	7th Alabama Cavalry; 5th Mississippi Cavalry; 7th Tennessee Cavalry; 12th Tennessee Cavalry; 14th Tennessee Cavalry: Ltc Raleigh R. White; 15th Tennessee Cavalry; Forrest's (3rd) Tennessee Regiment: Col David C. Kelley
Chalmers' Division; BG James R. Chalmers	Biffle's Brigade Col Jacob B. Biffle	4th Tennessee Cavalry; 9th Tennessee Cavalry; 10th Tennessee Cavalry
Buford's Division; BG Abraham Buford	Bell's Brigade Col Tyree H. Bell	2nd/22nd Tennessee Cavalry (Barteau's); 19th Tennessee Cavalry; 20th Tennessee Cavalry; 21st Tennessee Cavalry: Col Andrew N. Wilson (w); Nixon's (22nd) Tennessee Regiment
Buford's Division; BG Abraham Buford	Crossland's Brigade Col Edward Crossland	3rd Kentucky Mounted Infantry; 7th Kentucky Mounted Infantry; 8th Kentucky Mounted Infantry; 12th Kentucky Cavalry; Huey's Kentucky Battalion
Jackson's Division; BG William H. Jackson	Armstrong's Brigade BG Frank C. Armstrong	1st Mississippi Cavalry; 2nd Mississippi Cavalry; 28th Mississippi Cavalry; Ballentine's Mississippi Regiment
Jackson's Division; BG William H. Jackson	Ross's Brigade BG Lawrence S. Ross	3rd Texas Cavalry: Ltc Jiles S. Boggess; 6th Texas Cavalry: Col Jack Wharton; 9th Texas Cavalry: Col Dudley W. Jones; 1st Texas Legion (27th Cavalry): Col Edwin R. Hawkins
	Artillery	Morton's Tennessee Battery: Cpt John W. Morton
