= Battle of Peachtree Creek order of battle: Confederate =

The following Confederate States Army units and commanders fought in the Battle of Peachtree Creek of the American Civil War. The Union order of battle is listed separately.

== Abbreviations used ==
=== Military rank ===
- Gen = General
- LTG = Lieutenant General
- MG = Major General
- BG = Brigadier General
- Col = Colonel
- Ltc = Lieutenant Colonel
- Maj = Major
- Cpt = Captain
- Lt = Lieutenant

=== Other ===
- (w) = wounded
- (mw) = mortally wounded
- (k) = killed in action
- (c) = captured

== Army of Tennessee ==
Gen John B. Hood

=== Stewart’s Corps ===
LTG Alexander P. Stewart
Escort

- Orleans Light Horse - Cpt Leeds Greenleaf

Division	Brigade	Regiments and Others
Loring's Division; MG William W. Loring; Escort: Company B, 7th Tennessee Cavalry: Cpt James P. Russell	Featherston's Brigade BG Winfield S. Featherston	1st Mississippi Infantry: Maj Milton S. Alcorn; 3rd Mississippi Infantry; 22nd Mississippi Infantry; 31st Mississippi Infantry; 33rd Mississippi Infantry; 40th Mississippi Infantry; 1st Mississippi Battalion Sharpshooters: Maj James M. Stigler
Loring's Division; MG William W. Loring; Escort: Company B, 7th Tennessee Cavalry: Cpt James P. Russell	Adams' Brigade BG John Adams	6th Mississippi Infantry: Col Robert Lowry; 14th Mississippi Infantry: Ltc Washington L. Doss; 15th Mississippi Infantry: Col Michael Farrell; 20th Mississippi Infantry: Col William N. Brown; 23rd Mississippi Infantry; 43rd Mississippi Infantry: Col Richard Harrison
Loring's Division; MG William W. Loring; Escort: Company B, 7th Tennessee Cavalry: Cpt James P. Russell	Scott's Brigade BG Thomas M. Scott	27th-35th-49th Alabama Infantry: Col Samuel S. Ives; 55th Alabama Infantry; 57th Alabama Infantry; 12th Louisiana Infantry
French's Division; BG Samuel Gibbs French	Ector's Brigade BG Mathew Ector	29th North Carolina Infantry: Ltc Bacchus S. Proffitt; 39th North Carolina Infantry: Col David Coleman; 9th Texas Infantry; 10th Texas Cavalry (dismounted): Col Cullen R. Earp; 14th Texas Cavalry (dismounted): Col John L. Camp; 32nd Texas Cavalry (dismounted): Col Julius A. Andrews; Jaques's Cavalry Battalion: Maj J. Jaques
French's Division; BG Samuel Gibbs French	Cockrell's Brigade BG Francis M. Cockrell	1st Missouri Cavalry-3rd Missouri Cavalry Btln. (dismounted); 1st-4th Missouri Infantry; 2nd-6th Missouri Infantry: Col Peter C. Flournoy; 3rd-5th Missouri Infantry: Col James McCown
French's Division; BG Samuel Gibbs French	Sear's Brigade BG Claudius W. Sears	4th Mississippi Infantry: Col Thomas N. Adair; 35th Mississippi Infantry; 36th Mississippi Infantry: Col William W. Witherspoon; 39th Mississippi Infantry; 46th Mississippi Infantry: Col William H. Clark; 7th Mississippi Infantry Battalion
Walthall's Division; BG Edward C. Walthall	Quarles's Brigade BG William A. Quarles	1st Alabama Infantry: Col Samuel L. Knox; 42nd Tennessee Infantry; 46th–55th Tennessee Infantry; 48th Tennessee Infantry; 49th Tennessee Infantry; 52nd Tennessee Infantry
Walthall's Division; BG Edward C. Walthall	Reynold's Brigade BG Daniel H. Reynolds	1st Arkansas Mounted Rifles (dismounted); 2nd Arkansas Mounted Rifles (dismounted); 4th Arkansas Infantry; 9th Arkansas Infantry; 25th Arkansas Infantry
Walthall's Division; BG Edward C. Walthall	Cantey's Brigade Col Edward A. O'Neal	17th Alabama Infantry; 26th Alabama Infantry; 29th Alabama Infantry; 37th Mississippi Infantry
Artillery; Ltc Samuel C. Williams	Waddell's Battalion	Bellamy's Alabama Battery; Emery's Alabama Battery: Cpt Winslow D. Emery; Missouri Battery
Artillery; Ltc Samuel C. Williams	Myrick's Battalion Maj John D. Myrick	Bouanchaud's Louisiana Battery; Cowan's Mississippi Battery; Barry's Lookout Tennessee Battery
Artillery; Ltc Samuel C. Williams	Storrs's Battalion Maj George S. Storrs	Ward's Alabama Battery; Hoskins' Mississippi Battery: Cpt James A. Hoskins; Guibor's Missouri Battery
Artillery; Ltc Samuel C. Williams	Preston's Battalion Maj William C. Preston	Lovelace's Selma, Alabama Battery: Lt Charles W. Lovelace; Tarrant's Alabama Battery; Mississippi Battery: Cpt James H. Yates

=== Hardee's Corps ===
LTG William J. Hardee

Division	Brigade	Regiments and Others
Cheatham's Division; MG Benjamin F. Cheatham	Maney's Brigade BG George Maney	1st-27th Tennessee Infantry; 4th Confederate (34th Tennessee) Infantry: Ltc Oliver A. Bradshaw; 6th-9th Tennessee Infantry; 19th Tennessee Infantry; 50th Tennessee Infantry: Col Stephen H. Colms; 24th Tennessee Infantry Battalion: Ltc Oliver A. Bradshaw
Cheatham's Division; MG Benjamin F. Cheatham	Wright's Brigade BG John C. Carter	8th Tennessee Infantry: Col John H. Anderson; 16th Tennessee Infantry: Maj Benjamin Randals; 28th Tennessee Infantry; 38th Tennessee Infantry: Ltc Andrew D. Gwynne, Maj Hamilton W. Cotter; 51st-52nd Tennessee Infantry
Cheatham's Division; MG Benjamin F. Cheatham	Strahl's Brigade BG Otho F. Strahl	4th–5th Tennessee Infantry; 24th Tennessee Infantry; 31st Tennessee Infantry; 33rd Tennessee Infantry; 41st Tennessee Infantry
Cheatham's Division; MG Benjamin F. Cheatham	Vaughn's Brigade BG Alfred J. Vaughn Jr.	11th Tennessee Infantry; 12th–47th Tennessee Infantry; 29th Tennessee Infantry: Col Horace Rice; 13th–154th Senior Tennessee Infantry
Cleburne's Division; MG Patrick Cleburne	Polk's Brigade BG Lucius E. Polk	1st-15th Arkansas Infantry; 5th Confederate (2nd Tennessee) Infantry; 2nd (Robison's) Tennessee Infantry; 35th-48th Tennessee Infantry
Cleburne's Division; MG Patrick Cleburne	Lowrey's Brigade BG Mark P. Lowrey	16th Alabama Infantry: Col Frederick A. Ashford; 33rd Alabama Infantry; 45th Alabama Infantry; 32nd Mississippi Infantry: Col William H. H. Tison; 45th Mississippi Infantry: Col Aaron B. Hardcastle
Cleburne's Division; MG Patrick Cleburne	Govan's Brigade BG Daniel Govan	2nd-24th Arkansas Infantry; 5th-13th Arkansas Infantry; 6th-7th Arkansas Infantry; 8th-19th Arkansas Infantry; 3rd Confederate Infantry: Cpt Mumford H. Dixon
Cleburne's Division; MG Patrick Cleburne	Granbury's Brigade BG Hiram B. Granbury	6th Texas Infantry; 7th Texas Infantry; 10th Texas Infantry; 15th Texas Infantry; 17th Texas Cavalry (dismounted); 24th Texas Cavalry (dismounted)
Walker's Division; MG William H.T. Walker	Jackson's Brigade BG John K. Jackson	65th Georgia Infantry: Cpt William G. Foster; 5th Mississippi Infantry; 8th Mississippi Infantry: Col John C. Wilkinson; 2nd Georgia Sharpshooters Battalion: Maj Richard H. Whiteley
Walker's Division; MG William H.T. Walker	Gists's Brigade BG States Rights Gist	46th Georgia Infantry; 8th Georgia Infantry Battalion: Ltc Zachariah L. Watters; 16th South Carolina Infantry; 24th South Carolina Infantry
Walker's Division; MG William H.T. Walker	Stevens's Brigade BG Clement H. Stevens (mw)	1st (Confederate) Georgia Infantry: Col George A. Smith; 25th Georgia Infantry; 29th Georgia Infantry; 30th Georgia Infantry; 66th Georgia Infantry; 1st Georgia Sharpshooter Battalion; 26th Georgia Infantry Battalion: Maj John W. Nisbet
Walker's Division; MG William H.T. Walker	Mercer's Brigade BG Hugh W. Mercer	1st (Olmstead's) Georgia Infantry; 5th Georgia Infantry; 57th Georgia Infantry; 63rd Georgia Infantry
Bate's Division; MG William B. Bate	Lewis's Brigade BG Joseph H. Lewis	2nd Kentucky Infantry; 4th Kentucky Infantry: Col Thomas W. Thompson; 5th Kentucky Infantry; 6th Kentucky Infantry; 9th Kentucky Infantry: Col John W. Caldwell
Bate's Division; MG William B. Bate	Tyler's Brigade BG Thomas B. Smith	37th Georgia Infantry: Ltc Joseph T. Smith; 10th Tennessee Infantry; 15th Tennessee Infantry; 20th Tennessee Infantry: Ltc William M. Shy; 30th Tennessee: Ltc James J. Turner; 4th Georgia Sharpshooters Battalion
Bate's Division; MG William B. Bate	Finley's Brigade BG Jesse J. Finley	1st-3rd Florida Infantry; 4th Florida Infantry-1st Florida Cavalry (dismounted); 6th Florida Infantry; 7th Florida Infantry
Artillery; Col Melancthon Smith	Hoxton's Battalion Maj Llewellyn G. Hoxton	Alabama Artillery Battery; Florida Artillery Battery; Mississippi Artillery Battery
Artillery; Col Melancthon Smith	Hotchkiss's Battalion Maj Thomas R. Hotchkiss	Helena (Arkansas) Artillery: Cpt Thomas J. Key; Alabama Artillery Battery: Lt H. Shannon; Mississippi Artillery Battery: Lt Henry N. Steele
Artillery; Col Melancthon Smith	Martin's Battalion	Missouri Artillery Battery; South Carolina Artillery Battery; Georgia Artillery Battery
Artillery; Col Melancthon Smith	Cobb's Battalion Maj Robert Cobb	Kentucky Artillery Battery: Lt Robert B. Matthews; Tennessee Artillery Battery; Louisiana Artillery Battery
Artillery; Col Melancthon Smith	Palmer's Battalion	Alabama Artillery Battery: Cpt Charles L. Lumsden; Georgia Artillery Battery: Cpt R.W. Anderson; Georgia Artillery Battery: Cpt M.W. Havis

=== Other units ===
Division	Brigade	Regiments and Others
Cavalry Division; BG William H. Jackson	Armstrong's Brigade BG Frank C. Armstrong	1st Mississippi Cavalry: Col Richard A. Pinson; 2nd Mississippi Cavalry: Maj John J. Perry; 28th Mississippi Cavalry; Ballentine's Mississippi Cavalry; Company "A" 1st Confederate Cavalry: Cpt James Ruffin
Cavalry Division; BG William H. Jackson	Ross's Brigade BG Lawrence S. Ross	1st Texas Legion: Col Edwin R. Hawkins; 3rd Texas Cavalry: Ltc Jiles S. Boggess; 6th Texas Cavalry: Ltc Peter F. Ross; 9th Texas Cavalry
Cavalry Division; BG William H. Jackson	Ferguson's Brigadee BG Samuel W. Ferguson	2nd Alabama Cavalry: Col John N. Carpenter; 56th Alabama Cavalry; 9th Mississippi Cavalry: Col Horace H. Miller; Perrin's Mississippi Cavalry: Col Robert O. Perrin; 12th Mississippi Cavalry Battalion: Col William M. Inge
Cavalry Division; BG William H. Jackson	Artillery Cpt John Waties	Georgia Artillery Battery; Missouri Artillery Battery: Cpt Houston King; South Carolina Artillery Battery: Lt R.B. Waddell
1st Division, Georgia Militia; MG Gustavus W. Smith	1st Brigade BG R.W. Carswell	1st Regiment State Troops: Col Edward H. Pottle; 2nd Regiment State Troops: Col Charles D. Anderson; 5th Regiment State Troops: Col S.S. Stanford; 1st Battalion State Troops: Ltc H.K. McCay
1st Division, Georgia Militia; MG Gustavus W. Smith	2nd Brigade BG Pleasant J. Philips	3rd Regiment State Troops: Col Q.M. Hill; 4th Regiment State Troops: Col Robert McMillan; 6th Regiment State Troops: Col J.W. Burney
1st Division, Georgia Militia; MG Gustavus W. Smith	3rd Brigade BG Charles D. Anderson	Composition unknown
1st Division, Georgia Militia; MG Gustavus W. Smith	4th Brigade BG H.K. McCay	Composition unknown
1st Division, Georgia Militia; MG Gustavus W. Smith	State Artillery Battalion Col C.W. Stiles	Composition unknown

== Sources ==
- Fortune City
