= Battle of Peachtree Creek order of battle =

The order of battle for the Battle of Peachtree Creek includes:

- Battle of Peachtree Creek order of battle: Confederate
- Battle of Peachtree Creek order of battle: Union
