= List of Confederate units from Mississippi in the American Civil War =

Flag of Mississippi, 1861-1865

This is a list of Mississippi Civil War Confederate Units, which fought for the Confederacy in the American Civil War. State Troops units that served Mississippi rather than the Confederate Army are also included here. The list of Union Mississippi units is shown separately.

== Confederate army ==
=== Infantry ===
- 1st Infantry
- 2nd Infantry
- 3rd Infantry
- 4th Infantry
- 5th Infantry
- 6th Infantry
- 7th Infantry
- 8th Infantry
- 9th Infantry
- 10th Infantry
- 11th Infantry
  - University Grays (Company A)
- 12th Infantry
- 13th Infantry
- 14th Infantry
- 15th Infantry
- 16th Infantry
- 17th Infantry
- 18th Infantry
- 19th Infantry
- 20th Infantry
- 21st Infantry
- 22nd Infantry
- 23rd Infantry
- 24th Infantry
- 26th Infantry
- 27th Infantry
- 29th Infantry
- 30th Infantry
- 31st Infantry
- 32nd Infantry
- 33rd Infantry
- 34th Infantry
- 35th Infantry
- 36th Infantry
- 37th Infantry
- 38th Infantry
- 39th Infantry
- 40th Infantry
- 41st Infantry
- 42nd Infantry
- 43rd Infantry
- 44th Infantry
- 45th Infantry (see 3rd Battalion)
- 46th Infantry
- 48th Infantry
- 1st Battalion, Infantry (see 44th Infantry)
- 2nd Battalion, Infantry (see 48th Infantry)
- 3rd Battalion, Infantry
- 5th Battalion, Infantry
- 6th Battalion, Infantry (see 46th Infantry)
- 7th Battalion, Infantry
- 8th Battalion, Infantry (late war consolidation of 5th, 8th, 32nd Regiments & 3rd Battalion)
- 9th Battalion, Infantry (late war consolidation of 7th, 9th, 10th, 41st, and 44th Regiments, and 9th Sharpshooters)
- 13th Battalion, Infantry

=== Sharpshooters ===
- 1st Battalion, Sharpshooters
- 9th Battalion, Sharpshooters (See 43rd Infantry)
- 15th Battalion, Sharpshooters

=== Cavalry ===
- 1st Cavalry
- 2nd Cavalry
- 3rd Cavalry
- 4th Cavalry
- 5th Cavalry
- 6th Cavalry
- 7th Cavalry (see 1st Partisan Rangers)
- 8th Confederate Cavalry
- 8th (Duff's) Cavalry
- 9th Cavalry
- 10th Cavalry (late war consolidated unit)
- 11th (Ashcraft's) Cavalry (late war consolidation of
  Ashcraft's, Ham's, and Lowry's cavalry regiments)
- 11th (Perrin's) Cavalry
- 12th Cavalry
- 14th Confederate Cavalry
- 28th Cavalry
- Wirt Adams' Cavalry Regiment
- Collins' Regiment, Cavalry
- Jeff. Davis Legion
- Ham's Regiment, Cavalry (see 11th Regiment, Ashcraft's)
- Harman's Regiment, Cavalry
- Lay's Regiment, Cavalry
- Powers' Regiment, Cavalry
- Yerger's Regiment, Cavalry
- 1st (Miller's) Battalion, Cavalry (see 1st Regiment, Cavalry)
- 2nd Battalion, Cavalry (see Jeff. Davis Legion)
- 3rd (Ashcraft's) Battalion, Cavalry (see 11th Regiment, Ashcraft's)
- 4th Battalion, Cavalry (see 8th Confederate Cavalry)
- 6th Battalion, Cavalry
- 12th Battalion, Cavalry
- 17th Battalion, Cavalry (see 9th Regiment, Cavalry)
- 18th Battalion (Chalmers'), Cavalry
- 19th Battalion, Cavalry (see 5th Regiment, Cavalry)
- 23rd Battalion, Cavalry (see Powers' Regiment)
- 24th Battalion, Cavalry
- Garland's Battalion (see 14th Confederate Cavalry)
- Hughes' Battalion, Cavalry (see 4th Regiment, Cavalry)
- Smyth's Battalion, Cavalry
- Stockdale's Battalion, Cavalry (see 4th Regiment, Cavalry)
- Street's Battalion, Cavalry

=== American Indian battalion ===
- 1st Choctaw Battalion, Cavalry & Infantry

=== Artillery ===
- 1st Light Artillery
- 14th Battalion Artillery
- Buckner Battery
- Confederate Guards Artillery
- English's Battery
- Jefferson Flying Artillery (aka Darden's Company)
- Madison Light Artillery
- Pettus Flying Artillery
- Quitman Light Artillery
- Seven Stars Artillery
- Smith's-Turner's Battery
- Stanford's Battery
- Warren Light Artillery

=== Partisan Rangers ===
- 1st (Falkner's) Partisan Rangers
- 2nd (Ballentine's) Partisan Rangers
- 12th Battalion, Partisan Rangers (see 12th Battalion, Cavalry)
- 18th Battalion, Partisan Rangers (see 18th Battalion, Cavalry)
- Outlaw's Battalion, Partisan Rangers

== State Troops ==
State Troops regiments were created beginning at the time of secession in January 1861, consisting of units that were mustered into the service of Mississippi rather than the Confederate Army. These units were reorganized in 1862 into infantry and cavalry regiments. In 1864 a second call for State Troops was issued by Governor Charles Clark, and new regiments were formed. Several of the State Troops cavalry regiments were later converted to Confederate service, as noted below.

=== Short term state units ===
- Army of 10,000: 5 infantry regiments, 1 battalion. 60-days state service, 1861.

=== Infantry ===
1862 State Troops:

- 1st Infantry (King's)
- 2nd Infantry (Quinn's)
- 3rd Infantry (Owens')
- 4th Infantry (Bromley's)
- 5th Infantry (Robinson's)
- 1st Battalion Infantry (Harper's)
- 2nd Battalion Infantry (Cook's)
- 3rd Battalion Infantry (Burgin's)
- 4th Battalion Infantry (Fairley's/Postletwait's)

1864 State Troops:

- 1st Infantry (Patton's)
- 2nd Infantry (Chandler's)
- 3rd Infantry (Summerville's)
- 1st Battalion Infantry (Harper's)

=== Cavalry ===
1862 State Troops:

- 1st Cavalry (Blythe's)
- 2nd Cavalry (Smith's/Lowry's), mustered into Confederate service as the 6th Cavalry.
- 3rd Cavalry (McGuirk's), mustered into Confederate service as the 3d Cavalry.
- 3rd Battalion Cavalry (Ashcraft's), mustered into Confederate service as Ashcraft's Battalion.
- Davenport's Battalion
- Dunn's Battalion
- Forrest's Battalion
- Ham's Battalion, mustered into Confederate service and consolidated with Ashcraft's Battalion.
- Harris' Battalion
- Perrin's Battalion, mustered into Confederate service as the 11th Cavalry.

1864 State Troops:

- 1st Cavalry (Foote's)
- 2nd Cavalry (Hill's)
- 3rd Cavalry (Easterling's)
- 4th Cavalry (Fisher's)
- 1st Battalion Cavalry (McNair's)
- 3rd Battalion Cavalry
- Pettus' Battalion Cavalry

== Reserves ==
- 1st Cavalry Regiment, Mississippi Reserves
- 2nd Cavalry Battalion, Mississippi Reserves
- 3rd Cavalry Battalion, Mississippi Reserves
- Gamblin's Cavalry Battalion, Mississippi Reserves
- Montgomery's Cavalry Battalion, Mississippi Reserves
- Moorman's Cavalry Battalion, Mississippi Reserves
- Peyton's Cavalry Battaliony, Mississippi Reserves
- Stubb's Cavalry Battalion, Mississippi Reserves

== See also ==
- Lists of American Civil War Regiments by State
