= William Alexander Percy (politician) =

American politician (1834–1888)

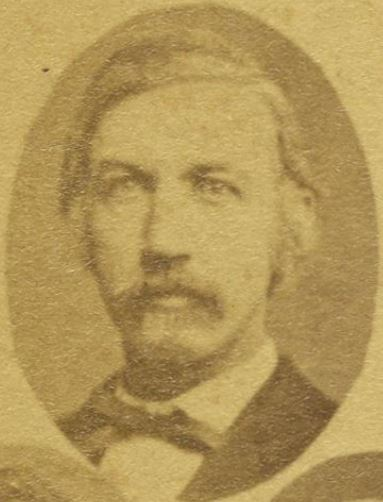
- c. 1878

37th Speaker of the Mississippi House of Representatives

Member of the Mississippi House of Representatives
- In office January 1878 – January 1880
- Preceded by: Hugh McQueen Street
- Succeeded by: Benjamin F. Johns

Member of the Mississippi House of Representatives from the Washington County district
- In office January 1876 – January 1880 Serving with 1878–1880: Wade Hampton Jr. 1876–1878: James B. Young
- Preceded by: W. H. Harris; John H. Morgan
- Succeeded by: John W. Shields; Peter Mitchell

Personal details
- Born: May 10, 1834 Huntsville, Alabama, U.S.
- Died: January 19, 1888 (aged 53) Greenville, Mississippi
- Party: Democratic
- Children: 5, including LeRoy

William Alexander Percy (May 10, 1834 – January 19, 1888) was an American lawyer, planter, and Democratic politician. He was the Speaker of the Mississippi House of Representatives from 1878 to 1880 and the father of U.S. senator LeRoy Percy.

== Early life ==
William Alexander Percy was born on May 10, 1834, in Huntsville, Alabama. He was the son of Thomas George Percy (1786–1841) and his wife, Maria (Pope) Percy. After his father's death in 1841, Percy moved along with his widowed mother and his brothers John Walker and Leroy to Washington County, Mississippi, where they reclaimed a tract of land which Percy's father had owned. By 1853, the Percy brothers and their mother had established the Percy Plantation on the Deer Creek near Greenville in that county. Percy received his early education in Alabama and then Mississippi. Percy then attended Princeton University, graduating with a B.A. in 1853. He then attended the University of Virginia School of Law, graduating around 1855. Percy began his law practice in Greenville in 1858.

== Military career ==
At the start of the U.S. Civil War, Percy joined the Confederate Army as a captain in the 22nd Mississippi Infantry Regiment. His company was the first to leave Washington County. In 1862, he became an assistant adjutant and inspector general on the staff of General John S. Bowen. Percy was captured when Vicksburg was besieged in July 1863. On October 8, 1863, Percy returned east, and became an assistant adjutant general to General Armistead Lindsay Long, the chief of the Army of Northern Virginia's 2nd Artillery Corps. In June 1864, Percy was appointed to the staff of Thomas Henry Carter and remained there until November, when he returned to Long's staff. At the end of 1864, Percy returned west as a lieutenant colonel in the 24th Mississippi Cavalry Battalion. He reached the rank of Colonel by the time of the Confederates' surrender.

== Political career ==
After the end of the Civil War, Percy bought a house in Greenville and returned to his law practice. As the South was now in the Reconstruction period, Percy, a Democrat, dedicated himself to restoring the planters' authority, viewing the free, voting, landowning blacks as a "social, political, and economic threat". Percy used a "fusion" policy in which rich white planters joined with Delta blacks who could be "enticed, bribed, or coerced" to vote for them, while setting aside a few offices for them to fill. In 1873, he established a "taxpayers' convention", a coalition of white landowners, to remove Republicans from power. In 1875, Percy was elected to represent Washington County in the Mississippi House of Representatives, and served in the 1876–1878 term. He was re-elected to the 1878–1880 term, and was the House's Speaker during that term. Percy was a delegate to the 1884 Democratic National Convention.

== Later life ==
After the end of Percy's speakership, Percy retired from politics and invariably refused to hold another higher office. He focused on his law practice and also served on the Levee Board. After retiring from politics, Percy advocated for increased railroads as well as sturdier levees. Percy died on January 19, 1888, aged 53 years.

== Personal life ==
Percy married Nancy Irving Armstrong on February 23, 1858. They had five children: Fannie, who died in 1882; William A., a lawyer in Memphis, Tennessee; LeRoy, a U.S. Senator; Walker, a lawyer in Birmingham, Alabama; and Lady, who married Charles McKinney.
