= 2nd Cavalry Battalion (Mississippi Reserves) =

Cavalry battalion of the Confederate States Army

- Active: 1864–65
- Disbanded: May 16, 1865
- Country: Confederate States
- Allegiance: Mississippi
- Branch: Mississippi Reserve Corps
- Type: Cavalry
- Size: Battalion
- Nickname: "Baskin’s Battalion"
- Facings: Yellow
- Wars: American Civil War

Commanders
- Commanding officer: Lieut. Col. J. B. Baskin

The 2nd Cavalry Battalion, Mississippi Reserves, also known as "Baskin’s Battalion," was a cavalry formation of the Mississippi Reserve Corps in the Western Theater of the American Civil War. It was commanded by Lieutenant Colonel J. B. Baskin from 1864 until disbanded in May 1865.

== History ==
The battalion was organized on September 26, 1864, at Grenada, Mississippi, as part of the Mississippi Reserve Corps. The commanding officer was Lieutenant Colonel J. B. Baskin, a native of South Carolina and resident of Chickasaw County, Mississippi. It was disbanded on May 16, 1865, at Columbus, Mississippi, following the surrender of the Department of Alabama, Mississippi, and East Louisiana by Lieutenant General Richard Taylor.

== See also ==
- List of Mississippi Civil War Confederate units
