= 20th Alabama Infantry Regiment =

Infantry regiment of the Confederate States Army

The 20th Alabama Infantry Regiment was a Confederate volunteer infantry regiment from Alabama during the American Civil War.

== History ==
The 20th Alabama Infantry Regiment was organized at Montgomery, Alabama on September 16, 1861. The brigade was part of the District of Alabama in the Department of Alabama and West Florida until January 1862, when it joined the Army of Mobile. The regiment was part of the Army of Mobile until February and in May became part of Barton's Brigade in the Department of East Tennessee. The 20th Alabama fought in the Battle of Cumberland Gap on June 18. In June it became part of Reynolds' Brigade in Stevenson's Division. In October it transferred to Tracy's Brigade of McCown's Division. Tracy's Brigade was sent to Vicksburg in December, fighting in the Battle of Chickasaw Bayou from December 27 to 29, and became part of Stevenson's Division in January. During the Vicksburg campaign, a detachment from the regiment participated in the response to the Greenville Expedition between April 2 and 25. The regiment fought in the Battle of Port Gibson on May 1 and the Battle of Champion Hill on May 16 before holding positions in the Confederate defenses of Vicksburg. The regiment surrendered at Vicksburg on July 4, 1863. It was paroled there later in the month. After being exchanged, in November, the regiment became part of Pettus' Brigade of Stevenson's Division in the 1st Corps of the Army of Tennessee, and was at the Battle of Lookout Mountain. The division was shifted to the 2nd Corps of the army in February 1864. During the Atlanta campaign, the regiment fought at Rocky Face Ridge, New Hope Church, Kennesaw Mountain, Atlanta, and Jonesborough. The regiment was not engaged at Franklin but fought at Nashville. With the remnants of the Army of Tennessee, the 20th Alabama fought in the Carolinas campaign, seeing action in the Battle of Wyse Fork and the Battle of Bentonville. In the final days of the war, the regiment was consolidated with the 30th Alabama Infantry Regiment to form the 20th Alabama Infantry Regiment (Consolidated) at Smithfield, North Carolina on April 9, 1865. Lieutenant Colonel James K. Elliott of the 30th Alabama commanded the unit in Pettus' Brigade, which surrendered with the army on April 26 at Durham station.

Its first commander was Lieutenant Colonel, Colonel Isham W. Garrott. Other field officers were John W. Davis (Major, Lieutenant Colonel), James M. Dedman (Lieutenant Colonel, Colonel), John G. Harris (Major), Edmund W. Pettus (Major, Lieutenant Colonel, Colonel), Alfred S. Pickering (Major), Mitchell T. Porter (Major, Lieutenant Colonel).
