= Benjamin F. Johns =

Mississippi politician (1830–1907)

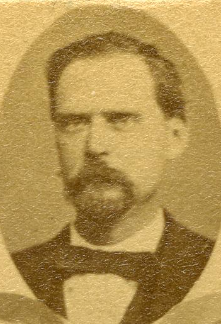

38th Speaker of the Mississippi House of Representatives

Member of the Mississippi House of Representatives
- In office January 1880 – January 1882
- Preceded by: W. A. Percy
- Succeeded by: W. H. H. Tison

Member of the Mississippi House of Representatives from the Amite County district
- In office January 1880 – January 1882
- In office 1876–1877

Personal details
- Born: March 9, 1830 Amite County, Mississippi
- Died: December 31, 1907 (aged 77) Gloster, Mississippi
- Party: Democratic

Benjamin Franklin Johns (March 9, 1830 - December 31, 1907) was an American Democratic politician and lawyer. He was the Speaker of the Mississippi House of Representatives from 1880 to 1882.

== Early life and career ==
Benjamin Franklin Johns was born in Amite County, Mississippi, on March 9, 1830. He was the eldest of the six surviving children of William F. Johns (1802-1882) and Rachel (Courtney) Johns (1807-1883). Johns attended the common schools of Amite County before attending the Western Military Institute for two years. He became a teacher for two years and then read law and was admitted to the bar in 1855. He then began practicing law in Liberty, Mississippi. When the American Civil War began in 1861, Johns joined the Confederate States Army and left Amite County with the position of Captain of the Second Company of Amite County, Company C of the 7th Mississippi Infantry Regiment. He was re-assigned to the Army of Tennessee, during which time he was eventually promoted to the rank of colonel.

== Political career ==
In 1866, Johns was elected to the office of probate judge. In 1875, Johns was elected to represent Amite County in the Mississippi House of Representatives and served in the 1876 and 1877 sessions. Johns was re-elected to the House in 1879 for the 1880-1882 term. During this term, Johns was elected to be the House's Speaker. In 1887, Johns moved his law practice to Gloster, Mississippi.

Johns died suddenly on December 31, 1907, in Gloster, Mississippi.
