= 16th and 25th Consolidated Louisiana Infantry Regiment =

Infantry regiment of the Confederate States Army

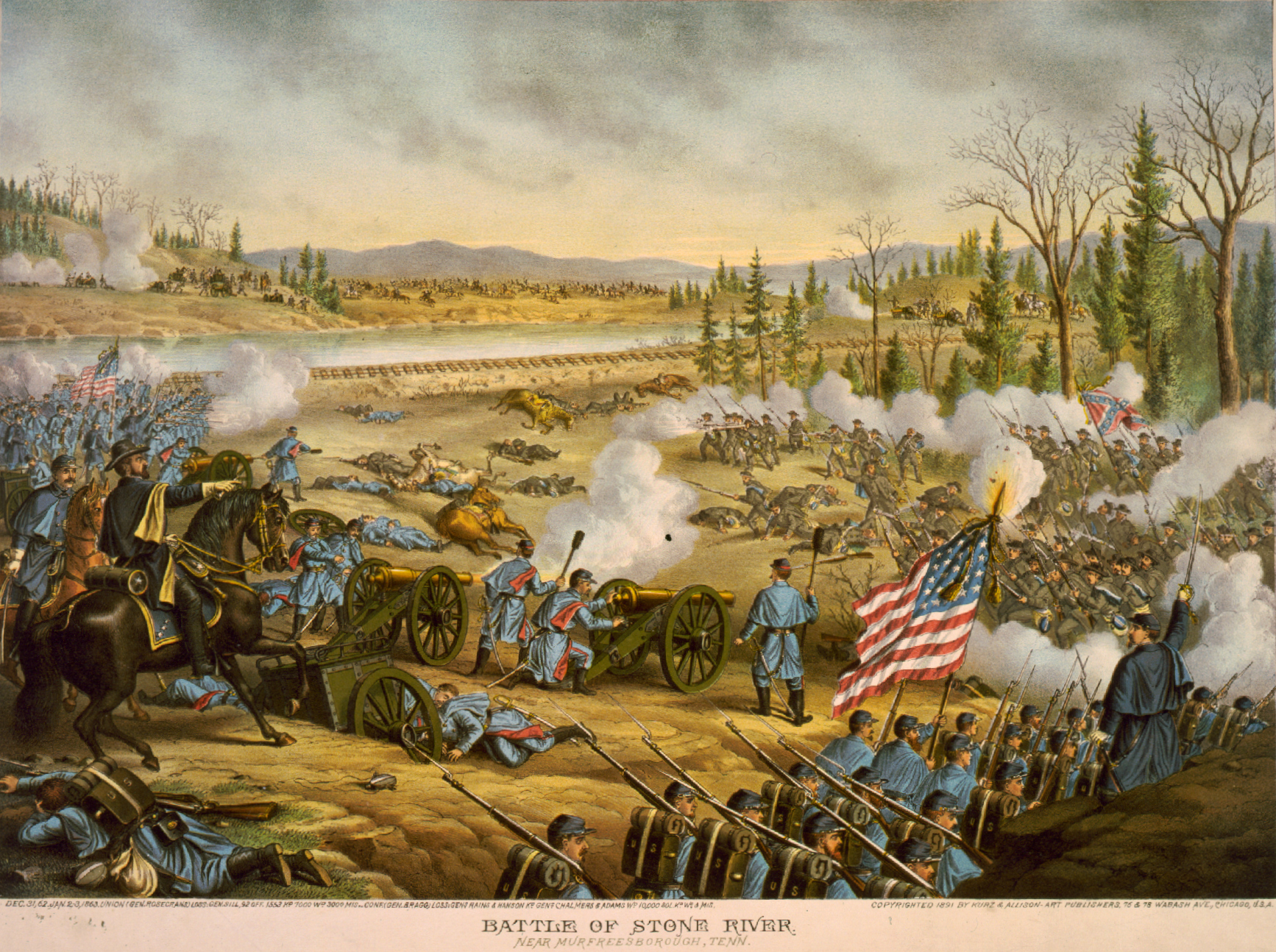
- The newly-formed regiment suffered crippling losses while attacking at the Battle of Stones River, shown here in a somewhat fanciful print.
- Active: 30 Nov. 1862 – February 1865
- Country: Confederate States of America
- Allegiance: Louisiana
- Branch: Confederate States Army
- Type: Infantry
- Size: Regiment (1,078 men, Nov. 1862)
- Part of: Adams', Gibson's Brigade
- Engagements: American Civil War; Battle of Stones River (1862–63); Jackson Expedition (1863); Battle of Chickamauga (1863); Battle of Missionary Ridge (1863); Battle of Resaca (1864); Battle of New Hope Church (1864); Battle of Atlanta (1864); Battle of Ezra Church (1864); Battle of Jonesborough (1864); Battle of Nashville (1864)

Commanders
- Notable commanders: Stuart W. Fisk

The 16th and 25th Consolidated Louisiana Infantry Regiment was a unit of volunteers recruited in Louisiana that fought in the Confederate States Army during the American Civil War. It served only in the Western Theater. The unit was created in November 1862 by combining the veteran 16th Louisiana and 25th Louisiana Infantry Regiments to form the consolidated regiment. The new unit served at Stones River, Jackson, Chickamauga, and Missionary Ridge in 1863. The unit fought at Resaca, New Hope Church, Atlanta, Ezra Church, Jonesborough, and Nashville in 1864. The consolidation was dissolved in February 1865 and the 16th and 25th Infantry Regiments were re-consolidated with other units

== See also ==
- List of Louisiana Confederate Civil War units
- Louisiana in the Civil War
