= 8th Mississippi Infantry Regiment =

Infantry regiment of the Confederate States Army

- Active: 1861–1865
- Country: Confederate States of America
- Allegiance: Mississippi
- Branch: Confederate States Army
- Type: Infantry
- Size: Regiment
- Engagements: American Civil War: Battle of Pensacola (1861); Battle of Stones River; Battle of Chickamauga; Battle of Missionary Ridge; Atlanta campaign; Battle of Franklin; Battle of Nashville

The 8th Mississippi Infantry Regiment was a unit of the Confederate States Army during the American Civil War. The 8th Regiment was composed of volunteer companies from Mississippi assembled in the fall of 1861. The Regiment fought in many battles of the Western theater of the American Civil War before surrendering in April 1865.

== History ==
The companies of the 8th Mississippi Infantry assembled at Enterprise in August, 1861, initially enrolling for 12–month' service. The total original strength of the 8th Mississippi was 888 officers and men. The regiment was mustered into Confederate service in October and sent to Pensacola, Florida to join the Southern forces under General Braxton Bragg who were besieging the forts held by Federal forces there. In May 1862, the Confederates abandoned their positions near Pensacola and the 8th Regiment was sent to Mobile, Alabama, where the men re–enlisted for 3 years. In the fall of 1862, the Regiment moved to Chattanooga, Tennessee to join General Bragg's forces during the Confederate Heartland Offensive. The 8th was assigned to General John K. Jackson's brigade and fought at the Battle of Stones River from December 31, 1862, to January 2, 1863. Colonel John C. Wilkinson, commander of the 8th Mississippi, was seriously wounded and captured in this battle, and the regiment suffered a 47% casualty rate.

In 1863, the 8th Regiment was stationed at Bridgeport, Alabama, and then moved to Chattanooga in August as Bragg's forces retreated from Middle Tennessee. Bragg's army was pursued by Union General William Rosecrans, who later forced the Confederates to retreat into Georgia. During the Battle of Chickamauga, Jackson's brigade, including the 8th Regiment, was assigned to General Benjamin F. Cheatham's division on the right wing of the Confederate line, and took part in a successful movement on September 19 that pushed back the advancing Union forces. Lieutenant Colonel Aden McNeill was killed during fighting at Chickamauga on September 20, and the Regiment suffered a 23% casualty rate. The Union forces retreated to Chattanooga, and Bragg's troops moved north against their position. During the Battle of Missionary Ridge, the Confederates were defeated and many men of the 8th Mississippi were captured.

In 1864, the 8th Regiment took part in the Atlanta campaign, fighting at Resaca, Adairsville, New Hope Church, Kennesaw Mountain, Peachtree Creek, Atlanta, Lovejoy's Station, and Jonesborough. The Regiment took major casualties in several of these battles: Lieutenant Colonel John F. Smith was killed at Pine Mountain on June 19, and commanding officer Colonel John C. Wilkinson was killed east of Atlanta on July 22. After the Atlanta campaign the regiment was reduced to an effective strength of 208 officers and men.

The 8th Mississippi then took part in the Franklin–Nashville campaign under General Mark Perrin Lowrey's brigade, including the Battle of Franklin on November 30, where the Regiment took heavy casualties and division commander General Patrick Cleburne was killed. Major Andrew E. Moody was placed in combined command of the depleted 8th and 32nd Mississippi regiments. After the Battle of Nashville, this combined unit retreated into North Mississippi.

On April 9, 1865, the surviving remnants of General Lowry's brigade, comprising the 5th, 8th, and 32nd Mississippi infantry regiments, along with the 3rd Mississippi Battalion, were combined into a consolidated unit titled the 8th Mississippi Battalion. This unit surrendered on April 26, 1865, at Greensboro, North Carolina.

== Commanders ==
Commanding officers of the 8th Mississippi:

- Col. Guilford G. Flynt
- Col. John C. Wilkinson, killed at Atlanta.
- Col. Aden McNeill, killed at Chickamauga.
- Lt. Col. James T. Gates
- Lt. Col. John F. Smith, killed at Pine Mountain near Atlanta.

== Notable Members ==
- Newton Knight, later deserted the Confederate Army and formed a Unionist guerrilla unit in Jones County, Mississippi.

== Organization ==
Companies of the 8th Mississippi:

- Company A, "Yankee Terrors" of Smith County.
- Company B, "Pinckney Guards" of Newton County.
- Company C, "True Confederates" of Smith County.
- Company D, "Moody True Blues" of Clarke County.
- Company E, "Tullahoma Hard Shells" of Lauderdale County.
- Company F, "Clarke County Rangers"
- Company G, "Tolson Guard" of Jasper County.
- Company H, "Southern Sentinels" of Lauderdale County.
- Company I, "Confederate Guards" of Lauderdale County.
- Company K, "Ellisville Invincibles" of Jones County.

== See also ==
- List of Mississippi Civil War Confederate units
