= 53rd Alabama Cavalry Regiment =

- Flag of Alabama in 1861 (obverse and reverse)
- Active: November 1862 to April 1865
- Country: Confederate States of America
- Allegiance: Confederate States Army
- Branch: Cavalry
- Engagements: American Civil War: Battle of Atlanta; Battle of Savannah; Carolinas campaign

The 53rd Alabama Cavalry Regiment, also known as the 53rd Alabama Partisan Rangers, was a cavalry regiment that served in the Confederate Army during the American Civil War.

The regiment was instrumental in the raid to capture a train load of cattle destined for General Sherman during the Atlanta campaign. The unit continued a guerrilla action as General Sherman marched to the sea in his scorched earth campaign to Savannah. The 53rd served in Mississippi, Alabama, Georgia, Florida and South Carolina.

== Creation of Unit ==
On April 21, 1862, the Confederate Congress passed the Partisan Ranger Act. The law was intended as a stimulus for recruitment of irregulars for service into the Confederate States Army during the American Civil War. On February 17, 1864 the Partisan Ranger Act was repealed after pressure from Robert E. Lee and other Confederate regulars persuaded Congress to repeal the act.

== Service ==
The 53rd Alabama Cavalry Regiment was organized at Montgomery, Alabama, in November, 1862. Two of its companies had seen prior service with the 7th Alabama Infantry Regiment. Men of this command were from the counties of Autauga, Butler, Lauderdale, Macon, Pike, Coosa, Tallapoosa, Dallas, Perry, Monroe, Wilcox, Lowndes, Dale, Coffee, and Montgomery. It first served in the District of the Gulf and in December contained 517 effectives. The unit was later assigned to Roddey's and M.W. Hannon's Brigade, Wheeler's Corps. It saw action at Thompson's Station, Brentwood, and Town Creek, was involved at the Atlanta Campaign, then participated in the defense of Savannah and the campaign of the Carolinas. Hannon's Brigade was in Sumter County, South Carolina when they received word to cease fire on April 21, 1865. They laid down arms at Columbia, SC, and were paroled at Augusta, Georgia during the first week of May 1865. Colonel Moses W. Hannon, Lieutenant Colonel John F. Gaines, and Major Thomas F. Jenkins were in command.

== Commanders ==
- Colonel Moses W. Hannon
- Lieutenant Colonel John F. Gaines
- Major Thomas F. Jenkins

== See also ==
- List of Confederate units from Alabama
