= 15th Tennessee Infantry Regiment =

The 15th Regiment, Tennessee Infantry was an infantry regiment from Tennessee that served with the Confederate States Army in the American Civil War. Among its notable battles were the Battle of Shiloh and the Battle of Chickamauga.

Company G, of the regiment was composed largely of residents of states outside Tennessee. Besides men from Tennessee, Missouri, and Kentucky, the company (originally named the "Illinois Company") included soldiers from the consistently Union states of Illinois, Minnesota, and Pennsylvania.

== See also ==
- List of Tennessee Confederate Civil War units
