= 3rd Mississippi Infantry Battalion =

American Civil War Military unit

3rd Mississippi Infantry Battalion 45th Mississippi Infantry Regiment
- Active: 1862 - 1865
- Disbanded: April 26, 1865
- Country: Confederate States
- Allegiance: Mississippi
- Branch: Army
- Type: Infantry
- Size: Battalion; Regiment
- Battles: American Civil War: Battle of Shiloh; Siege of Corinth; Battle of Perryville; Battle of Stones River; Battle of Chickamauga; Battle of Missionary Ridge; Battle of Ringgold Gap; Atlanta Campaign; Battle of Franklin; Battle of Nashville; Carolinas Campaign

The 3rd Mississippi Infantry Battalion, designated as the 45th Mississippi Infantry Regiment from 1862 to 1864, was a Confederate infantry unit from Mississippi which fought in many battles of the Western theater of the American Civil War. Upgraded to a regiment in 1862 following the Battle of Shiloh, as the 45th Mississippi the regiment took in heavy fighting in Kentucky, Tennessee, and Georgia before being downgraded to a battalion again in the midst of the Atlanta Campaign. The 3rd Battalion surrendered with General Joseph E. Johnston's army in North Carolina in April, 1865.

== History ==
A group of volunteer companies were originally organized as the 3rd Battalion Mississippi Infantry at Grenada in November 1861. The battalion was led by Aaron Hardcastle, who was a graduate of West Point and a native of Maryland. Hardcastle had had been serving as aide-de-camp to General Albert Sidney Johnston in California, both men resigned from the US Army at the outbreak of the civil war and traveled overland from California to Texas to join the Confederate army. The 3rd Battalion then joined the Confederate invasion of Kentucky over the winter of 1861-62. The battalion was first engaged at the April 1862 Battle of Shiloh, putting up a strong defense when the Federals attacked the Confederate lines. The service of the battalion in this battle was noted by General S. A. M. Wood, who reported: "Major Hardcastle's battalion fired the first shot in our army on the enemy, and we only left the field at the close of Monday's fight."

After Shiloh the battalion was upgraded to a regiment, briefly called the 33rd, but then officially designated as the 45th Mississippi Infantry Regiment. The 45th then moved to Corinth, Mississippi, a vital railroad junction, and defended it during the siege of Corinth until federal troops captured the town. Afterwards the regiment joined the Confederate Heartland Offensive, returning to Kentucky and fighting at the Battle of Perryville in October 1862 and the Battle of Stones River at the close of the year. Losses at Stones River were severe, with a 53% casualty rate for the 217 men of the regiment engaged in battle.

In 1863 the 45th fought as a consolidated unit with the 32nd Mississippi at the Battle of Chickamauga in Georgia, and took part in the Chattanooga campaign in Tennessee, fighting at Missionary Ridge and Ringgold Gap. In 1864 the regiment fought in the Atlanta Campaign, but due to heavy losses, in July the regiment was downgraded to a battalion and given its old designation as the 3rd Battalion. The Battalion continued to serve on the defensive lines around the city, taking part in the battles at Atlanta, Jonesborough, and Lovejoy's Station. During the Franklin-Nashville Campaign the Battalion fought as part of General Patrick Cleburne's division, which took heavy losses at the Battle of Franklin on November 30, 1864. After retreating from Tennessee, the battalion joined the Carolinas Campaign in the spring of 1865, where it was consolidated with the remnants of the 5th, 8th, and 32nd Mississippi Infantry Regiments into a new organization called the Eighth Mississippi Battalion. This unit surrendered on April 26, 1865, at Greensboro, North Carolina.

== Commanders ==
Commanders of the 45th Regiment:

- Col. Aaron B. Hardcastle
- Lt. Col. Richard Charlton
- Lt. Col. John D. Williams

== See also ==
- List of Mississippi Civil War Confederate units
