= 37th Tennessee Infantry Regiment =

- Flag of Tennessee
- Active: 1861–1863
- Country: Confederate States of America
- Allegiance: Confederate States Army
- Branch: Army of Tennessee
- Type: Infantry
- Nickname(s): 1st East Tennessee Rifle Regiment
- Engagements: American Civil War: Battle of Mill Springs; Battle of Chickamauga

Commanders
- Notable commanders: William Henry Carroll; Chesley Jarnigan; William M. Shy

The 37th Tennessee Infantry Regiment was an infantry regiment from Tennessee that served with the Confederate States Army in the American Civil War.

The regiment was organized in Knoxville in late 1861. It was composed mainly of men from counties such as Grainger, Blount, Sevier, Bradley, Washington, Jefferson, Bedford with others joining from North Georgia and Alabama. Colonel William Henry Carroll had a hard time acquiring weapons for his men, and there delivery to the regiment was delayed for several weeks. By December 9, 1861, Carroll had nearly 800 recruits but had only enough weapons for 200. A week later he was reprimanded by Judah P. Benjamin for not following his order to procure enough weapons, who also threatened to disband the regiment if this issue was not quickly resolved. Within a month, Carroll had armed his regiment and was on the march to meet up with the 38th Tennessee Infantry Regiment under Felix Zollicoffer. The 37th arrived at Mill Springs and were greeted joyously as reinforcements. The entire ordeal turned into a failure, and Zollicoffer died in battle. Carroll was criticized and resigned from his post as a consequence. Chesley Jarnigan, a 28-year-old merchant, took command of the 37th and commanded it until his death in the Battle of Chickamauga.

== See also ==
- List of Tennessee Confederate Civil War units
