= 17th Alabama Infantry Regiment =

Infantry regiment of the Confederate States Army

- Flag of Alabama in 1861 (obverse and reverse)
- Active: August 1861 to April 1865
- Country: Confederate States of America
- Branch: Confederate States Army
- Type: Infantry
- Engagements: Battle of Shiloh; Battle of Nashville; Battle of Franklin; Battle of Bentonville

Commanders
- Notable commanders: Col. Thomas H. Watts

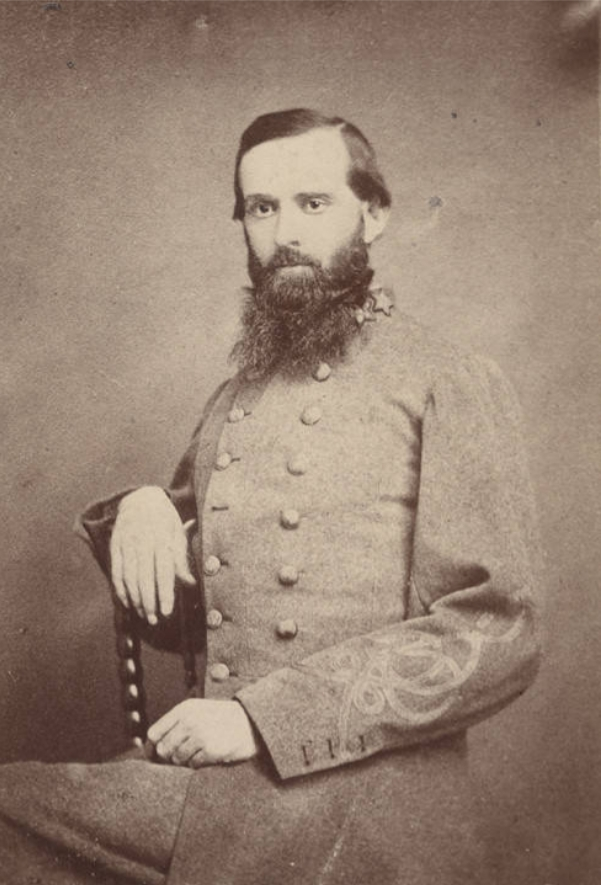
Colonel Virgil S. Murphy

The 17th Alabama Infantry Regiment was an infantry regiment that served in the Confederate Army during the American Civil War.

== Service ==
The 17th Alabama Infantry Regiment was mustered in at Montgomery, Alabama in August 1861 under Colonel Thomas H. Watts. Watts organized the 17th Infantry and led it at Pensacola and Corinth, but resigned as its colonel to serve as the Confederacy's attorney general in President Jefferson Davis' cabinet.

The regiment surrendered at Greensboro, North Carolina in April 1865.

== Total strength and casualties ==
When regiment was organized at Montgomery, Alabama, it took 900 men hailing from Coosa, Lowndes, Montgomery, Pike, Randolph, Monroe, Butler, and Russell counties.

The regiment sustained particularly heavy losses in 1864 after it joined the Army of Tennessee.

== Commanders ==
- Col. Thomas H. Watts
- Col. Virgil S. Murphy

== See also ==
- List of Confederate units from Alabama
