= 6th Tennessee Infantry Regiment =

The 6th Regiment, Tennessee Infantry was an infantry regiment from Tennessee that served in the Confederate States Army. Notable battles that the regiment fought in include the Battle of Shiloh.

A notable officer of the Regiment was Captain James William Boyd, who had a strong resemblance to John Wilkes Booth.

== See also ==
- List of Tennessee Confederate Civil War units
