= 9th Tennessee Infantry Regiment =

Infantry regiment of the Confederate States Army

The 9th Tennessee Infantry Regiment, commonly known as the "Ninth Tennessee", was an infantry formation in the Confederate States Army during the American Civil War. The regiment participated in the Battle of Shiloh.

== See also ==
- List of Tennessee Confederate Civil War units
