= 45th Tennessee Infantry Regiment =

The 45th Regiment, Tennessee Infantry was an infantry regiment from Tennessee that served with the Confederate States Army in the American Civil War. Notable battles the regiment has engaged in include Shiloh and Chickamauga.

== See also ==
- List of Tennessee Confederate Civil War units
