= 33rd Tennessee Infantry Regiment =

Confederate infantry regiment

The 33rd Regiment, Tennessee Infantry was an infantry regiment from Tennessee that served in the Confederate States Army. Notable battles that they took part in include the Battle of Shiloh and the Battle of Chickamauga.

== See also ==
- List of Tennessee Confederate Civil War units
