= 5th Tennessee Infantry Regiment =

Confederate States Army unit

The 5th Tennessee Infantry was an infantry regiment from Tennessee that served in the Confederate States Army. The unit was organization at Paris, Henry County, Tennessee, on May 20, 1861. The regiment fought at New Madrid, Battle of Shiloh, Perryville, Murfreesboro, and Chickamauga.

== See also ==
- List of Tennessee Confederate Civil War units
