= W. H. H. Tison =

American politician (1822–1882)

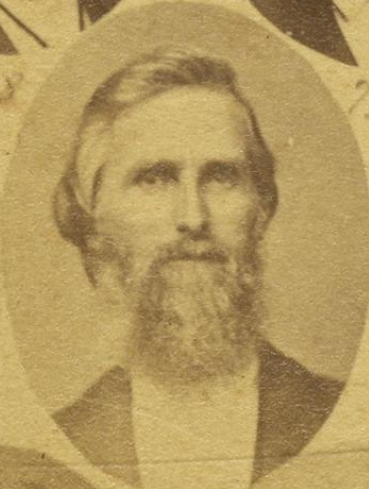
- Official portrait, 1878

39th Speaker of the Mississippi House of Representatives
- In office January 3, 1882 – December 4, 1882
- Preceded by: Benjamin F. Johns
- Succeeded by: William M. Inge

Member of the Mississippi House of Representatives from Lee County
- In office January 3, 1882 – December 4, 1882
- In office 1874 – 1880

Member of the Mississippi House of Representatives from Tishomingo County
- In office 1856 – 1858
- In office 1850 – 1852

4th Postmaster of Carrollville, Mississippi
- In office April 20, 1853 – April 14, 1855
- Nominated by: Franklin Pierce
- Preceded by: Richard B. Clayton
- Succeeded by: Richard B. Clayton

Personal details
- Born: William Henry Haywood Tison; November 6, 1822 Jackson County, Alabama, U.S.
- Died: December 4, 1882 (aged 60) Baldwyn, Mississippi, U.S.
- Cause of death: Homicide (gunshot wound)
- Resting place: Masonic Cemetery, Baldwyn, Mississippi, U.S. 34°29′48.8″N 88°37′43.8″W
- Party: Democratic
- Spouse: Sarah S. Walker (m. 1853)
- Children: 5
- Parents: Richard Tison; Nancy Tison

Military service
- Allegiance: Confederate States
- Branch: Army
- Years of service: 1861–1865
- Rank: Colonel
- Commands: Company K, 19th Mississippi Infantry Regiment (1861–62); 32d Mississippi Infantry Regiment (1863–65)
- Battles: American Civil War; Battle of Resaca (WIA); Battle of Peachtree Creek; Battle of Atlanta (WIA); Battle of Franklin (WIA)

William Henry Haywood Tison (November 6, 1822 – December 4, 1882) was an American politician who served as the 39th speaker of the Mississippi House of Representatives from January 1882 until his assassination 11 months into his speakership.

== Biography ==
A member of the Democratic Party, Tison represented Lee and Tishomingo counties. During the American Civil War he served as an officer in the Confederate States Army, leading the 32d Mississippi Infantry Regiment during the Atlanta Campaign, and was wounded at the Battle of Atlanta and Battle of Franklin. On December 4, 1882, J. Edward Sanders shot him on the sidewalk of Front Street in Baldwyn, Mississippi.

== See also ==
- List of assassinated American politicians
- List of assassinations by firearm
- List of people from Mississippi

== Notes ==
Political offices
Preceded by Benjamin F. Johns	Speaker of the Mississippi House of Representatives; 1882	Succeeded by William M. Inge
