= 5th Mississippi Infantry Regiment =

Infantry regiment of the Confederate States Army

- Active: 1861–1865
- Country: Confederate States
- Allegiance: Mississippi
- Branch: Army
- Type: Infantry
- Size: Regiment
- Equipment: Mississippi Rifles, altered smooth bore "George Law" Muskets, 57 caliber Enfield Rifle Musket, Springfield Rifle.
- Engagements: American Civil War: Battle of Shiloh; Battle of Stones River; Battle of Chickamauga; Battle of Chattanooga; Battle of Peachtree Creek; Battle of Atlanta; Battle of Franklin; Battle of Nashville; Battle of Bentonville

Commanders
- Notable commanders: John R. Dickins; Albert E. Fant; John Weir

The 5th Mississippi Infantry Regiment was a regiment of infantry in the Confederate States Army during the American Civil War. The 5th Regiment was composed of volunteer companies from central Mississippi and assembled in the fall of 1861 by Colonel Albert E. Fant. After taking heavy casualties in battles in Georgia and Tennessee, the regiment surrendered in April 1865.

== Battles and campaigns ==
The 5th Mississippi was organized in April – August 1861, with a total strength of 736 men. The 5th Regiment was first sent to Pensacola, returning to Mississippi in 1862 and taking part in the Battle of Shiloh and Siege of Corinth. Under General John K. Jackson, the 5th Regiment took part in heavy fighting at the Battle of Stones River on December 31, 1862, retreating to Chattanooga and Georgia afterwards.

At the Battle of Chickamauga in September 1863, the 5th Regiment was heavily engaged, with Lt. Col. W.L. Sykes killed in battle. The regiment was further involved in other battles of the Atlanta campaign, fighting at Peachtree Creek, Turner's Ferry, and New Hope Church, Lovejoy's Station and the Battle of Atlanta.

After retreating from Atlanta, the 5th Regiment fought in the Franklin–Nashville campaign, with battles at Franklin, Decatur, Columbia, Spring Hill, and Nashville. Having taken heavy casualties in this campaign, the 5th Regiment was reorganized with the 8th and 32nd Mississippi Infantry Regiments, along with the Third Battalion, Mississippi Infantry, into the consolidated Eighth Mississippi Battalion. This consolidated unit surrendered on April 26, 1865, and was paroled at Greensboro, North Carolina.

== Commanders ==
- Colonel Albert E. Fant.
- Colonel John Weir, wounded in action at Franklin.
- Lt. Col. Samuel F.M. Faucett
- Lt. Col. W.L. Sykes, killed at Chickamauga
- Major Adam T. Stennis
- Major John B. Herring

== Organization ==
Companies of the 5th Mississippi Infantry Regiment:

- Company A, "Red Rovers" of Monroe County
- Company B, "Bogue Chitto Rangers" of Neshoba County
- Company C, "Lauderdale Springs Greys" of Lauderdale County
- Company D, "New Prospect Greys" of Winston County
- Company E, "Pettus Rebels" of Winston County
- Company F, "Winston Rifles" of Winston County
- Company G, "Barry Guards" of Chickasaw & Choctaw Counties
- Company H, "Noxubee Blues" of Noxubee County
- Company I, "Kemper Rebels", raised in Kemper County
- Company K, "Scotland Guards" raised in Neshoba County

== See also ==
- List of Mississippi Civil War Confederate units
