= 28th Tennessee Infantry Regiment =

- Active: September 1861 - April 26, 1865
- Country: (Confederate States of America) Confederate States
- Allegiance: Tennessee
- Branch: Militia
- Type: Line infantry
- Size: Regiment
- Nicknames: "2nd Mountain Tennessee Volunteers" or "2nd Tennessee Mountain Volunteers"
- Engagements: Battle of Murfreesboro; Battle of Chickamauga; Atlanta Campaign; Battle of Nashville; Battle of Franklin; Carolinas Campaign; Battle of Bentonville

The 28th Regiment, Tennessee Infantry, also known as the 2nd Mountain Volunteers, was an infantry regiment from Tennessee that served with the Confederate States Army in the American Civil War. Notable battles that the regiments have been engaged in include the Battle of Shiloh and the Battle of Chickamauga.

== Organization ==
The regiment was organized at Camp Zollicoffer in September 1861. The companies of the regiment were recruited from the counties of Cumberland, Overton, Putnam, Wilson, Jackson, Smith, and White.

== Service ==
The regiment fought at Fishing Creek, Shiloh and at Port Hudson, serving at Jackson, Mississippi, where they were attached to M.J. Wright's and Maney's Brigade of the Army of the Tennessee.,

On March 8, 1863, the regiment was merged with the 84th Tennessee and would take part in the battles of Murfreesboro and the Atlanta Campaign.

The regiment surrendered on April 26, 1865

== See also ==
- List of Tennessee Confederate Civil War units
