= Robert O. Perrin =

American physician (1823-1878)

President of the Greene County, Alabama, Board of Health
- In office September 26, 1878 – October 8, 1878

Personal details
- Born: Robert Oliver Perrin; November 3, 1823 Edgefield District, South Carolina, U.S.
- Died: October 8, 1878 (aged 54) Eutaw, Alabama, U.S.
- Cause of death: Heart disease
- Resting place: Mesopotamia Cemetery, Eutaw, Alabama, U.S. 32°51′04.5″N 87°53′56.6″W
- Spouses: Elizabeth A. Spencer (m. 1845, died) Mary E. Collier (m. 1874)
- Relations: Abner M. Perrin (brother)
- Children: 4
- Occupation: Physician; farmer

Military service
- Allegiance: Confederate States
- Branch: Army
- Years of service: 1861–1865
- Rank: Colonel
- Commands: Company C, Jeff. Davis Legion (1861–62); 11th Mississippi Cavalry Regiment (1863–65)
- Battles: American Civil War; Battle of Peachtree Creek; Battle of Atlanta; Battle of Ladiga

Robert Oliver Perrin (November 3, 1823 – October 8, 1878) was an American medical doctor who served as president of the Greene County, Alabama, Board of Health until his death in 1878.

Perrin previously served as a senior officer of the Confederate States Army, commanding the 11th Mississippi Cavalry Regiment in the Western Theater of the American Civil War from 1863 until he resigned his commission in 1865. He died on October 8, 1878, at his home in Eutaw, Alabama, of heart disease at the age of 54.

== Notes ==
Military offices
New regiment	Commanding Officer of the 11th Mississippi Cavalry Regiment; 1863–1865	Succeeded by Lieutenant-Colonel Henry L. Muldrow; Acting
