= 24th Tennessee Infantry Regiment =

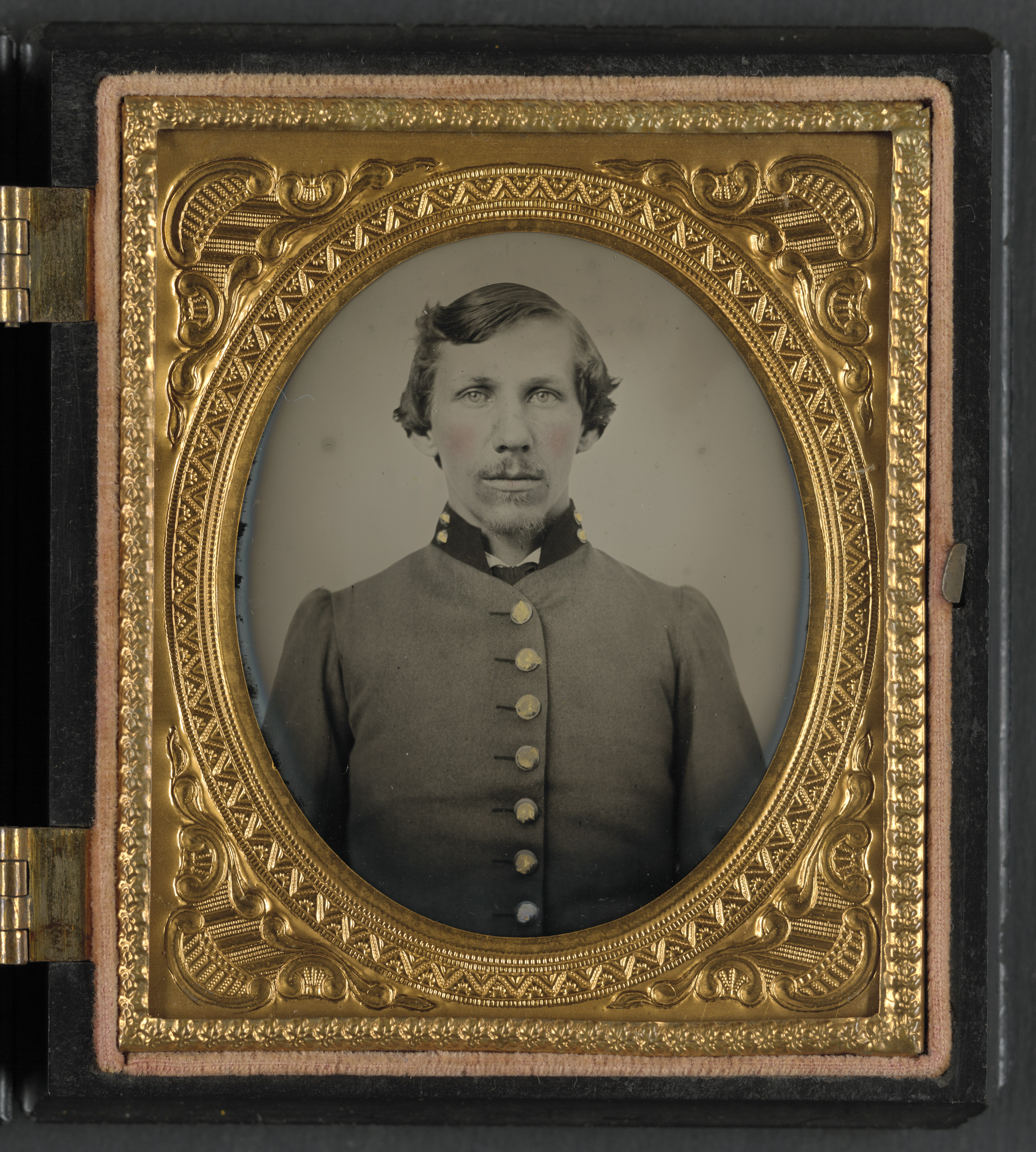
Lieutenant Smith Whitfield of Co. B, 24th Tennessee Infantry Regiment

The 24th Regiment, Tennessee Infantry was an infantry regiment from Tennessee that served with the Confederate States Army in the American Civil War. Notable battles fought in include the Battle of Shiloh, Battle of Murfreesboro (Stones River) commanded by Col Hugh L. W. Bratton in Cheatham's Division, and the Battle of Chickamauga.

== See also ==
- List of Tennessee Confederate Civil War units
