= 32nd Mississippi Infantry Regiment =

Infantry regiment of the Confederate States Army

- Active: 1862–1865
- Disbanded: April 9, 1865
- Country: Confederate States
- Allegiance: Mississippi
- Branch: Army
- Type: Infantry
- Size: Regiment
- Facings: Light blue
- Battles: American Civil War; Battle of Perryville; Battle of Murfreesboro; Battle of Chickamauga; Battle of Missionary Ridge; Battle of Ringgold Gap; Atlanta Campaign; Battle of Spring Hill; Battle of Franklin; Battle of Nashville; Battle of Bentonville
- Battle honors: Perryville; Murfreesboro; Chickamauga; Ringgold Gap

Commanders
- Commanding officers: Col. Mark P. Lowrey; Col. W. H. H. Tison (WIA)

The 32nd Mississippi Infantry Regiment was an infantry formation of the Confederate States Army in the Western Theater of the American Civil War. It was successively commanded by Colonels Mark P. Lowrey and W. H. H. Tison.

== History ==
The 32nd Mississippi Infantry Regiment was recruited in the spring of 1862 by Mark P. Lowrey, who had led a regiment in the Army of 10,000, a group of Mississippi volunteers sent to join the Confederate invasion of Kentucky in late 1861. When that regiment was disbanded at the end of its term of service in early 1862, Lowrey returned home, but was urged by his community to form a new regiment after the Confederate defeat at Fort Donelson in February. The 32nd Mississippi was then organized at Corinth on April 3, with Lowrey as colonel, but was not equipped in time to participate the Battle of Shiloh that same month.

Assigned to the brigade of General S. A. M. Wood, the regiment joined the Confederate Heartland Offensive in the fall of 1862 and fought at the Battle of Perryville in October. General Wood was wounded in this battle, and Lowrey took over command of Wood's brigade. The regiment then retreated into Tennessee and Georgia in 1863. In September, Colonel Lowrey led a consolidated command made up of the 32nd and 45th Mississippi infantry regiments at the Battle of Chickamauga. On the second day of the battle, the regiment came under severe fire from the Union lines while attacking a fortified position. According to Colonel Lowrey's report: "In a very short time I lost over one-fourth of my command in killed and wounded,": 25 were killed and 141 were wounded from the two regiments he led at Chickamauga. Although his command had suffered heavy losses, Lowrey's actions under fire earned him favorable notice and he was promoted to brigadier general the next month.

The regiment, now part of a brigade commanded by General Lowrey in General Patrick Cleburne's division, moved into Tennessee and joined the Chattanooga campaign. At the Battle of Missionary Ridge in November, the regiment helped repulse an attack by Union General William T. Sherman's troops on the right wing of the Confederate line, preventing a flanking maneuver that would have captured the Confederate wagon train and artillery.

During the 1864 Atlanta Campaign the regiment was led by Colonel W. H. H. Tison, and took part in battles at Resaca, New Hope Church, Peachtree Creek, Atlanta, Lovejoy's Station, and Jonesborough. Casualties were particularly severe at the Battle of Atlanta on July 22, with 18 killed, 45 wounded, and 23 missing or captured.

Following the Confederate defeat in Georgia, the regiment moved north and fought in the Franklin-Nashville Campaign in Tennessee. During the Battle of Franklin on November 30; division commander General Cleburne was killed; and commanding officer of the regiment, Col. Tison, was wounded during disastrous Confederate assaults on the Union troops' fortified positions. After the Confederate defeat at the Battle of Nashville in December, it retreated to North Mississippi.

On April 9, 1865, the regiment was consolidated with the 3rd Mississippi Infantry Battalion and the 5th and 8th Mississippi infantry regiments to form the 8th Mississippi Infantry Battalion.

== Regimental order of battle ==
Companies of the 32nd Regiment Mississippi Infantry:

- Company A (Tishomingo Avengers)
- Company B (William R. Nelson Guards)
- Company C (Tishomingo Rebels)
- Company D (Lowrey Rebels)
- Company E (Hatchie Tigers)
- Company F (Southern Farmers)
- Company G (Lowrey Invincibles)
- Company H (Beauregard Rifles)
- Company I (Johnston Avengers)
- Company K (Buckner Boys)

== Commanding officers ==
Commanding officers of the 32nd Regiment Mississippi Infantry:

- Col. Mark P. Lowrey, promoted to Brigadier General, 1863.
- Col. W. H. H. Tison, wounded at Franklin, 1864.

== See also ==
- List of Confederate units from Mississippi
