= Mark Perrin Lowrey =

US Confederate general & preacher (1828-1885)

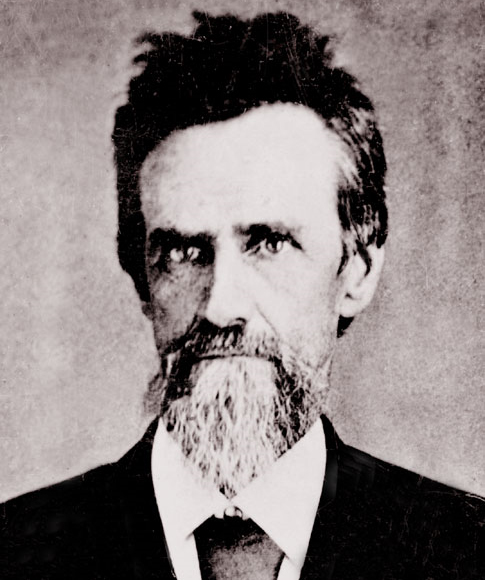
- Mark Perrin Lowrey, Brigadier General in the Confederate Army
- Born: December 30, 1828; McNairy County, Tennessee
- Died: February 27, 1885 (aged 56); Middleton, Tennessee
- Burial place: Old Macedonia Cemetery, Blue Mountain, Mississippi
- Military career
- Allegiance: United States of America; Confederate States of America
- Rank: Private (USA); Brigadier General (CSA)
- Nicknames: "Preacher General" "The Gallant Preacher Soldier"
- Conflicts: Mexican-American War; American Civil War
- Other work: Preacher; Founder and President of the Blue Mountain Female Institute which is now called the Blue Mountain College.

Mark Perrin Lowrey (December 30, 1828 – February 27, 1885) was a Southern Baptist preacher otherwise known as the "Preacher General". He is known for being a Confederate brigadier general during the Civil War, for his works in the Mississippi Southern Baptist Convention, and for founding Blue Mountain College.

== Early life and career ==
Mark Perrin Lowrey was born in 1828, in McNairy County, Tennessee, to Adam and Marguerite (Doss) Lowrey. His parents had immigrated to America from England and Ireland, and Lowrey received no formal education. His father died from yellow fever in Natchez Mississippi, when Lowrey was young. In 1843, he moved with his family to Mississippi, where he became a bricklayer. During the Mexican War, Lowrey enlisted as a private in the 2nd Mississippi Volunteers in 1847. Neither he nor his regiment ever saw action in the conflict, and Lowrey was mustered out in July 1848.

After the war with Mexico ended, Lowrey married Sarah R. Holmes in 1849. In 1853, he was ordained to the Gospel Ministry at Farmington Baptist Church in Farmington, Mississippi. That same year, he became a Southern Baptist preacher, serving primarily around the village of Kossuth, Mississippi. After preaching for eight years, the American Civil War broke out and his congregation urged him to join the Confederacy. Lowrey also served as a captain in the Mississippi State Militia in 1861.

== Civil War service ==
Lowrey began his war service in Mississippi's armed forces as the colonel of the 4th Regiment, Army of 10,000. This unit was disbanded in early 1862, and on April 3, 1862, he joined the Confederate army as commander of the 32nd Mississippi Infantry. During the war Lowrey fought in the Kentucky Campaign, the Battle of Chickamauga, the Atlanta Campaign, and the Franklin-Nashville Campaign. At the Battle of Perryville in October 1862, Lowrey was shot in the left arm but stayed on the battlefield. During the retreat which began the next day, he had great difficulty keeping up with the army. He then obtained leave and traveled to his brother's house for safety. After six weeks of recuperation, Lowrey joined back with his forces and fought at the Battle of Murfreesboro on January 1, 1863.

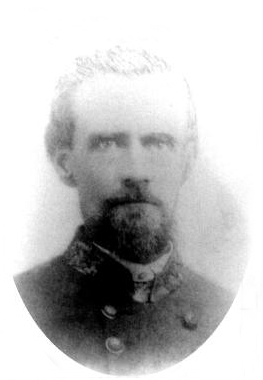
Lowrey as a Confederate Army General officer

Earning notice for his leadership under fire at Chickamagua, on October 4, 1863 at the age of 35 Mark Lowrey was promoted to a Brigadier General. It was because of his evangelistic ties and preaching that he came to be known as the "Preacher General". In December 1864, during the Franklin-Nashville Campaign, an officer saw the flash of an enemy gun and yelled to Lowrey, who quickly lowered himself and the bullet stuck and killed a man behind him. Years of bad health and other reasons caused Lowrey to resign his commission as a brigadier general on March 14, 1865, almost one month before the Confederate forces surrendered at Appomattox Courthouse. Maj. Gen. Patrick Cleburne, Lowrey's divisional commander during the Franklin-Nashville Campaign, pronounced Lowrey "the bravest man in the Confederate Army."

== Postbellum career and death ==
After the war, Lowrey moved back to Mississippi and focused on his studies. Then, in 1873, he founded the Blue Mountain Female Institute, which later became known as the Blue Mountain College. Lowrey would also serve as president of the Mississippi Baptist convention from 1868 to 1877.

Lowrey then persuaded a friend, Colonel William C. Falkner, to run his railroad near the college. Since he was a major shareholder of Falkner's Railroad, the plan was soon carried out. The school became quite a success and 3 generations of Lowreys became presidents of the school: General Lowrey himself, two of his sons, and a grandson. Following several years of teaching at the Blue Mountain College, Lowrey became very sick and, in 1882, his doctors alerted him that his heart was very weak. Then, on February 27, 1885, while buying a train ticket at Middleton, Tennessee, he turned, gasped, and fell to the floor dead.

== Possible family wealth ==
Lowrey lore states that sometime after Mark and Sarah were married an English grandfather of Lowrey's mother, Margaret (Doss) Lowrey, died, leaving a six million dollar fortune to his descendants. Before the arrangements could be made for the family to get the money, the Civil War began and the descendants became preoccupied with other matters. At the war's end, Lowrey once again tried to claim his share of the English estate left behind by his ancestor, but it was discovered that the papers pertaining to the money and estate were lost or destroyed.

== See also ==
- List of American Civil War generals (Confederate)
