= 20th Louisiana Infantry Regiment =

Infantry regiment of the Confederate States Army

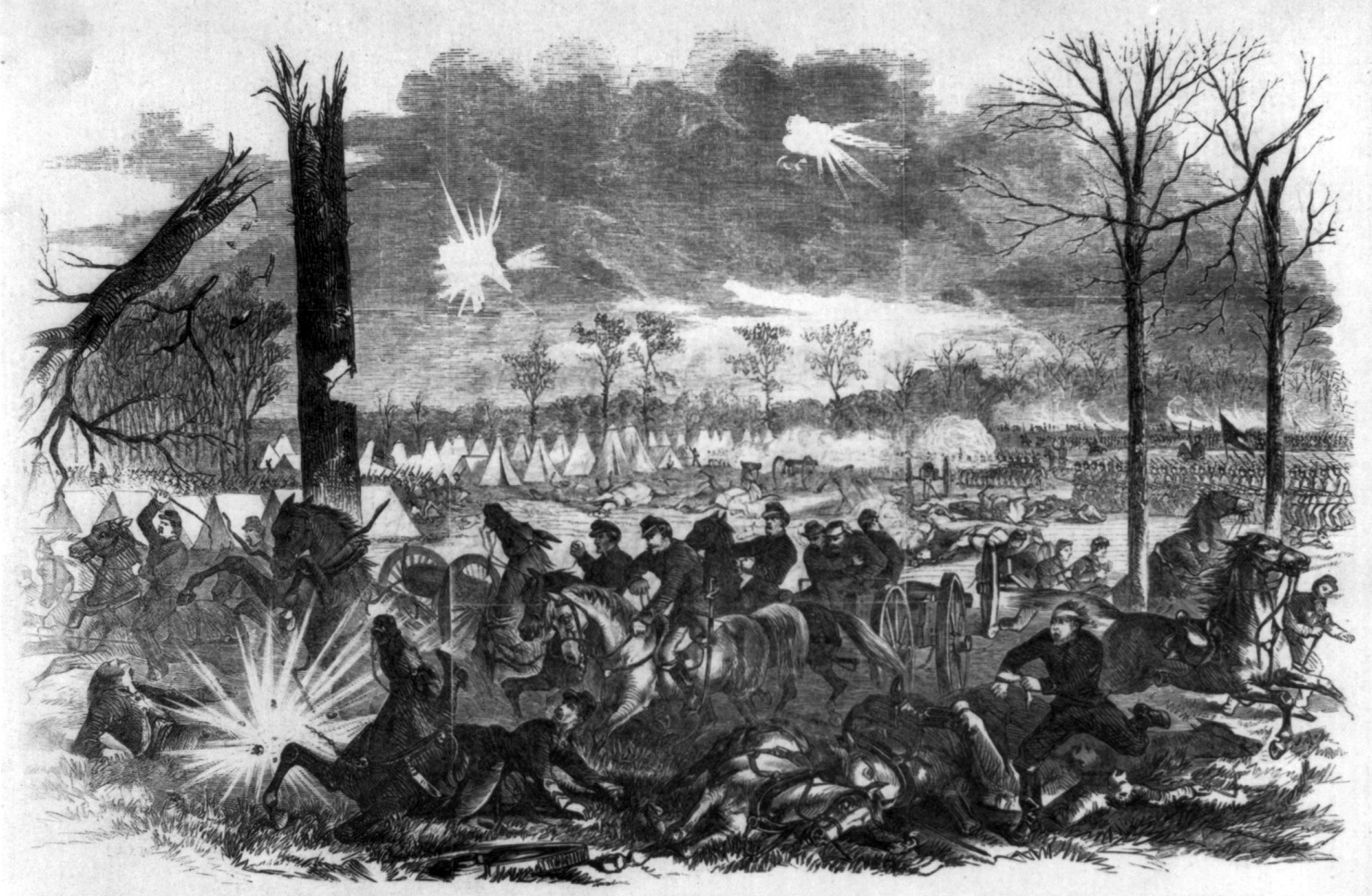
- The Battle of Shiloh was the first action of the 20th Louisiana Infantry. Print shows a Union battery retreating before Confederate attackers on 6 April.
- Active: 3 January 1862 – 8 May 1865
- Country: Confederate States of America
- Allegiance: Confederate States of America, Louisiana
- Branch: Confederate States Army
- Type: Infantry
- Size: Regiment (879 men, Jan. 1862)
- Part of: Anderson's, Adams', Gibson's Brigade
- Nickname: Lovell Regiment
- Engagements: American Civil War; Battle of Shiloh (1862); Siege of Corinth (1862); Battle of Perryville (1862); Battle of Stones River (1862–63); Jackson Expedition (1863); Battle of Chickamauga (1863); Battle of Missionary Ridge (1863); Battle of Resaca (1864); Battle of New Hope Church (1864); Battle of Ezra Church (1864); Battle of Nashville (1864); Battle of Spanish Fort (1865)

Commanders
- Notable commanders: Augustus Reichard

The 20th Louisiana Infantry Regiment was a unit of volunteers recruited in Louisiana that fought in the Confederate States Army during the American Civil War. The unit began its existence as the 6th Louisiana Battalion in September 1861. The battalion was augmented to regimental strength in January 1862 at New Orleans and served during the war in the Western Theater of the American Civil War. The regiment fought at Shiloh, Farmington, and Perryville in 1862. After being reduced in numbers, the regiment was consolidated with the 13th Louisiana Infantry Regiment and served at Stones River, Jackson, Chickamauga, and Missionary Ridge in 1863. The 13th-20th Consolidated Louisiana fought at Resaca, New Hope Church, Ezra Church, and Nashville in 1864. The consolidation with the 13th Louisiana was discontinued in February 1865 and the regiment was re-consolidated with other units. It fought its final battle at Spanish Fort one month before surrendering in May 1865.

== 6th Louisiana Infantry Battalion ==
The 6th Louisiana Infantry Battalion organized at Camp Lewis in New Orleans in September 1861. Major Augustus Reichard was appointed commander of the battalion, which included 315 men in four companies, all recruited from Orleans Parish, Louisiana. The unit's nickname was the Lovell Battalion after Major General Mansfield Lovell, the Confederate commander at New Orleans. The captains were L. C. Buncken (Company A - Turner Guards), F. Burger (Company B - Steuben Guards), F. Reitmeyer (Company C - Reichard Rifles), and Charles Assenheimer (Company D - Louisiana Musketeers). The 6th Battalion was absorbed into the 20th Louisiana Infantry Regiment on 3 January 1862.

== Formation ==
The regiment was formed at Camp Lewis on 3 January 1862 by adding six independent militia companies to the four companies of the 6th Louisiana Battalion. The new regiment, which mustered 879 men, marched to Camp Benjamin on 4 January. The field officers were Colonel Reichard, Lieutenant Colonel Samuel Boyd, and Major Leon Von Zinken. Von Zinken had served in the Prussian Army and was the son of a general. Boyd resigned on 4 June 1862 and was replaced as lieutenant colonel by Von Zinken, while Charles Guillet became major. Guillet was killed on 2 January 1863 and replaced as major by Samuel L. Bishop. Reichard resigned on 7 July 1863 and was replaced as colonel by Von Zinken, while Bishop was promoted to lieutenant colonel. The company commanders are listed in the following table.

Company information for the 20th Louisiana Infantry Regiment
Company	Nickname	Captains	Recruitment Parish
A	Steuben Guards	Gebhard Kehrwald (ds); Richard Hackett	Orleans
B #1	Louisiana Musketeers	Charles Assenheimer	Orleans
B #2	Noel Rangers	Alexander Dresel	Orleans
C	Reichard Rifles	Herrmann Muller (r); John Schaedel	Orleans
D	Turner Guards	L. C. Buncken (r); Theodore Schneider (k-Chickamauga); Theodore Eichholtz (m); Samuel Sutter	Orleans
E #1	Orleans Blues Company A	Richard Herrick	Orleans
E #2	no name	Albert A. Lipscomb	Orleans
F	Florence Guards	H. Brummerstadt (k-Stones River); Edmund Lachenmeyer	Orleans
G	Orleans Blues Company B	Patrick Clark (r); Thomas M. Ryan (m); Adolphus P. Webre (k-Ezra Church); John D. Caulfeld	Orleans
H	Stanley Guards	H. H. Rainey (r); James Cousley (x); Fred W. Airey	Orleans
I	Forstall Guards	William Boyd (r); Robert L. Keene	Orleans
K	Jameson Light Guards	Thomas O'Neil (r); Samuel L. Bishop (p); Daniel Maegher (ds); Charles J. Harper	Orleans

- Key: ds = deserted, k = killed, m = mortally wounded, p = promoted, r = resigned/retired, x = dropped.

== Service ==
=== Shiloh to Perryville ===
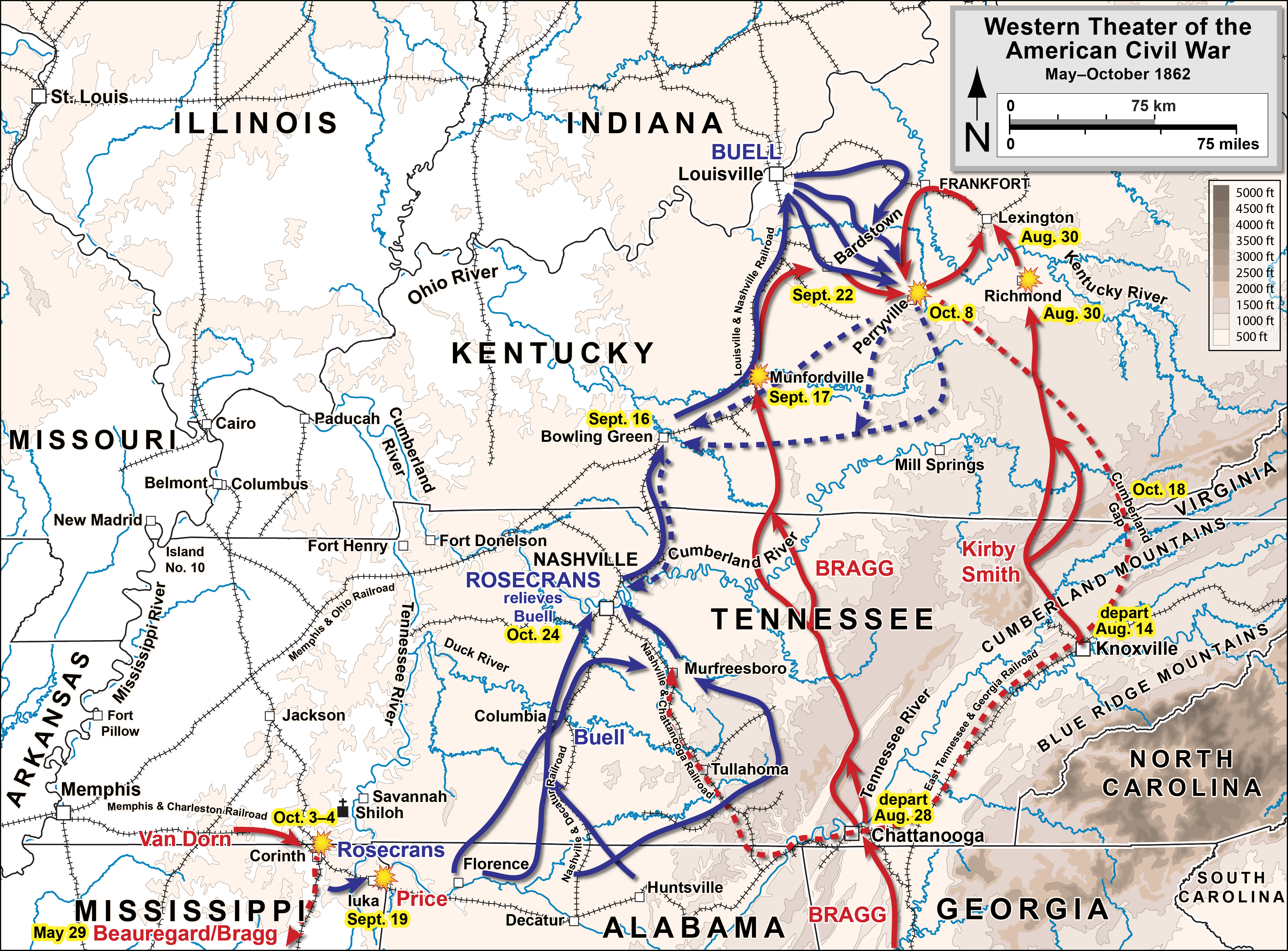
Bragg's advance to Perryville and retreat.

In February 1862, several companies of the 20th Louisiana Infantry were detached to Fort Jackson, Pass Manchac, and Berwick. Companies B and E never returned to the regiment and both were replaced by new companies. The new Company E did not join the regiment until 23 July 1862. The unit left Louisiana to go to Corinth, Mississippi, on 11 March. The regiment fought at the Battle of Shiloh on 6–7 April 1862. At Shiloh, the 20th Louisiana Infantry was part of Brigadier General James Patton Anderson's 2nd Brigade, Brigadier General Daniel Ruggles' 1st Division, Major General Braxton Bragg's Second Corps, General Albert Sidney Johnston's Army of Mississippi. The regiment was brigaded with the 17th Louisiana and 9th Texas Infantry Regiments, 1st Florida Infantry and 12th Louisiana (Confederate Guards Response) Battalions, and the 5th Company, Washington Artillery. At Shiloh, the brigade lost 69 killed, 313 wounded, and 52 missing. Early on the first day of battle, Anderson's brigade attacked Brigadier General William Tecumseh Sherman's Union division in underbrush so thick that Colonel Reichard claimed that he could not see "five paces ahead". Late in the day, the 20th Louisiana became separated from Anderson's brigade. On the second day, the regiment was reunited with its brigade and defended the left flank. Reichard had his horse killed under him. The 20th Louisiana Infantry went into battle with 3 field officers, 5 staff officers, 27 company officers, and 472 rank and file, a total of 507 men. The casualty report was missing.

During the Siege of Corinth, Major General Henry Halleck cautiously led 110,000 Union troops against 60,000 Confederate defenders under General P. G. T. Beauregard. During this operation, the 20th Louisiana Infantry skirmished at Monterey on 29 April and at Farmington on 9 May. At Farmington, Anderson's brigade clashed with Union troops under Major General John Pope and Brigadier General John M. Palmer. The Confederates sustained 119 casualties while the Federals lost 16 killed and 157 wounded or missing. On 30 May, Beauregard abandoned Corinth and withdrew behind the Tuscumbia River.

At the Battle of Perryville on 8 October 1862, the 20th Louisiana Infantry was part of Brigadier General Daniel Weisiger Adams's brigade, Anderson's division, Major General William J. Hardee's Left Wing, Bragg's Army of Mississippi. The regiment numbered 360 men and suffered losses of 1 killed, approximately 15 wounded, and 16 missing. The other units in Adams' brigade were the 13th, 16th, and 25th Louisiana Infantry Regiments, the 14th Louisiana Battalion, and the 5th Company, Washington Artillery. That morning, Adams' Louisianans changed into new uniforms and discarded their old lice-infested clothing. Afterward, the brigade was ordered to march toward the fighting, but allow another brigade to catch up. Since the following brigade stopped for unknown reasons, Adams' advance was slow. Adams' troops finally went into action alongside Brigadier General Patrick Cleburne's brigade. After the battle, Bragg's army retreated from Kentucky via Cumberland Gap and Knoxville, Tennessee.

=== Consolidation ===
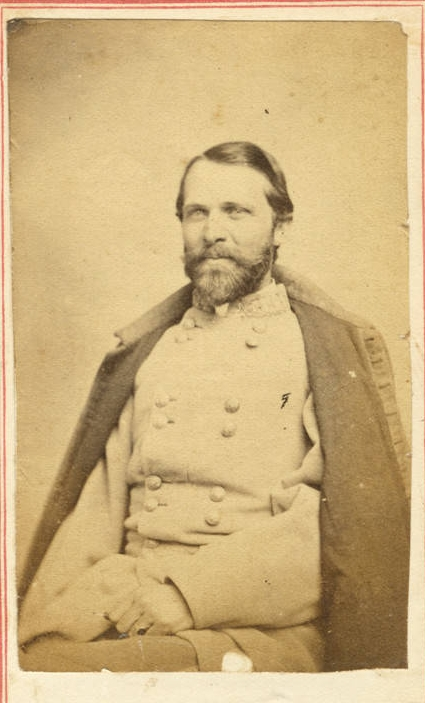
Randall L. Gibson

On 30 November 1862 at Shelbyville, Tennessee, Bragg ordered the regiment consolidated with the 13th Louisiana Infantry because both units had suffered heavy losses. Each of the two regiments was reorganized into five companies, so that the 13th-20th Louisiana Consolidated Infantry Regiment had ten companies. Randall L. Gibson (of the 13th) was appointed colonel, Von Zinken lieutenant colonel, and Guillet major. The companies from the 20th Louisiana and their captains were: Company A (Lipscomb), Company D (Bishop), Company F (Keene), Company G (Brummerstadt), and Company H (Ryan).

The consolidated regiment fought at the Battle of Stones River. In the battle, the consolidated regiment lost 187 men killed, wounded, or missing on 31 December 1862, while 129 became casualties on 2 January 1863. Major Guillet and Captain Brummerstadt were killed on 2 January and Captain Ryan died from his wounds on 20 January. At Stones River, the 13th-20th Louisiana Infantry was in Adams' brigade, Major General John C. Breckinridge's division, Hardee's Corps, Bragg's Army of Tennessee. Adams' brigade was the same as at Perryville, except the 32nd Alabama Infantry was added. On 31 December, Bragg ordered Breckinridge to attack the Round Forest, which had become a Federal strongpoint. When Adams' troops attacked, they became the target of four Union batteries. As the 13th-20th Louisiana moved to the attack, it was struck in its right flank by two Indiana regiments. Within 30 minutes, Adams' brigade was repulsed with the loss of 426 men killed and wounded. On 2 January, Breckinridge's division assaulted the Union left flank, with Adams' brigade in the second line on the left. At first, the attack was a success, but the pursuing Confederates suddenly found themselves facing 45 Federal cannons. The subsequent bombardment stopped Breckinridge's soldiers and caused them to flee.

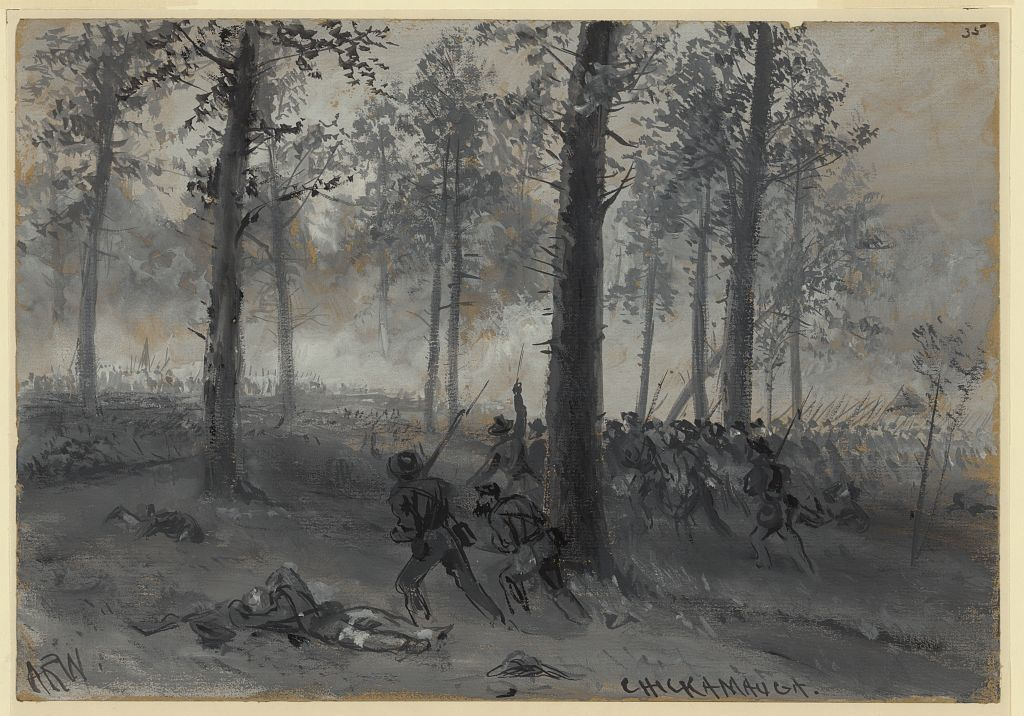
Battle of Chickamauga by Alfred Waud

The 13th-20th Louisiana Infantry went into winter quarters near Tullahoma, Tennessee. In May 1863 the regiment transferred to General Joseph E. Johnston's army at Jackson, Mississippi. On 5–25 July, it served during the Siege of Jackson. In August 1863, the regiment returned to Bragg's Army of Tennessee where it fought in the Battle of Chickamauga on 19–20 September. At Chickamauga, the regiment was in Adams' brigade, Breckinridge's division, Lieutenant General Daniel Harvey Hill's corps. Adams' brigade suffered 429 casualties in the fighting. Adams was wounded and captured, and Gibson assumed command of the brigade, which had the 19th Louisiana Infantry added since Stones River. At 11 am on the second day, Adams' brigade and another brigade broke through the Federal left flank. Adams' troops actually advanced into the Union rear, but they were compelled to retreat after bitter fighting. Captain Schneider was killed at Chickamauga.

At the Battle of Missionary Ridge on 25 November 1864, the 13th-20th Louisiana Infantry was in Gibson's brigade, Major General Alexander P. Stewart's division, Breckinridge's corps. The Alabama regiment was replaced by the 4th Louisiana Infantry Battalion, otherwise the brigade was the same as at Chickamauga. The brigade lost 28 killed, 96 wounded, and 233 missing. Breckinridge inexplicably did not order the top of the ridge entrenched until the night on 23 November. He also insisted on holding rifle pits at the base of the ridge which made two weak lines instead of one strong one. When the defenses to Gibson's right were breached by the Federals, his brigade was hit in front and flank, and collapsed.

The 13th-20th Louisiana Infantry spent the winter of 1863–1864 in camp near Dalton, Georgia before serving in the Atlanta campaign. The regiment was part of Gibson's brigade, Lieutenant General John Bell Hood's corps, General Joseph E. Johnston's Army of Tennessee. In addition to the 16th-25th and 19th Louisiana Infantry Regiments and the 4th and 14th Infantry Battalions, Gibson's brigade included the 1st Louisiana Regulars, 4th Louisiana, and 30th Louisiana Infantry Regiments. During the campaign, the 20th was led variously by Colonel Von Zinken, Major Bishop, and Captains Keene and Dresel. The 13th-20th Louisiana fought at the Battle of Resaca on 14–15 May 1864, Battle of New Hope Church on 25 May, and Battle of Ezra Church on 28 July, suffering serious losses in the latter action, including Captain Webre killed.

When Confederate States President Jefferson Davis visited the Army of Tennessee at Palmetto, Georgia, on 25 September 1864, the band of the 20th Louisiana serenaded him. The rag-tag outfit had only a few horns and drums, but it was considered "one of the better bands" in the army. The band also played when the army, now led by Hood, launched its invasion of Tennessee (Franklin–Nashville campaign) on 13 November. Previously, on 29 October, Gibson's brigade drove some Federal cavalry out of Florence, Alabama. On 15 December at the Battle of Nashville, Gibson's brigade provided the rearguard after part of Hood's army stampeded. On 16 December, Hood's army was routed again, and this time Gibson's brigade was brushed aside by the Union pursuers. After losing about 100 men during the retreat, Gibson's brigade, now about 500 strong, tried to defend the bridge at Franklin, Tennessee, on 17 December. Federal cavalry surrounded the brigade and Gibson's men fought their way out, losing another 40 men.

=== 1865 ===
At Mobile, Alabama, on 3 February 1865, the consolidation with the 13th Louisiana ended. Instead, the 20th Louisiana was consolidated with the 1st Louisiana Regulars and 16th Louisiana Infantry Regiments. In the new configuration, the 1st-16th-20th Louisiana Infantry fought at the Battle of Spanish Fort on 27 March – 8 April 1865. After Mobile was evacuated, the survivors of the 20th Louisiana were reformed into a single company, which became Company H of the Pelican Regiment. The unit surrendered to the Union Army at Gainesville, Alabama on 8 May 1865.

== See also ==
- List of Louisiana Confederate Civil War units
- Louisiana in the Civil War
