= 13th and 20th Consolidated Louisiana Infantry Regiment =

Infantry regiment of the Confederate States Army

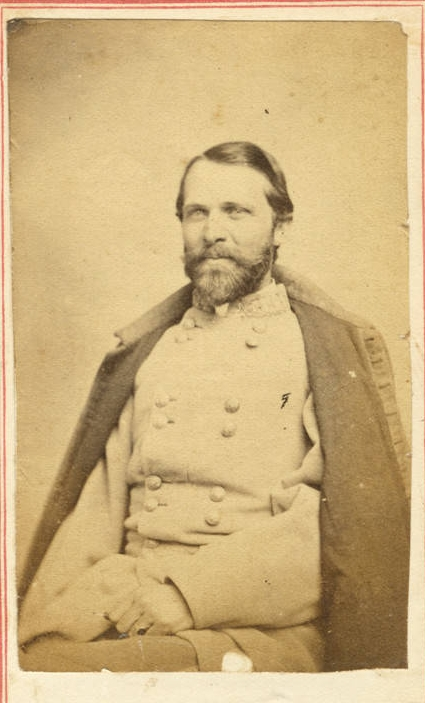
- Randall L. Gibson was the regiment's first colonel. He later led the brigade in which the regiment served.
- Active: 30 Nov. 1862 – Feb. 1865
- Country: Confederate States of America
- Allegiance: Louisiana
- Branch: Confederate States Army
- Type: Infantry
- Size: Regiment (1,075 men, Nov. 1862)
- Part of: Adams' and Gibson's Brigade
- Engagements: American Civil War; Battle of Stones River (1862–63); Jackson Expedition (1863); Battle of Chickamauga (1863); Battle of Missionary Ridge (1863); Battle of Resaca (1864); Battle of New Hope Church (1864); Battle of Ezra Church (1864); Battle of Jonesborough (1864); Battle of Nashville (1864)

Commanders
- Notable commanders: Randall L. Gibson

The 13th and 20th Consolidated Louisiana Infantry Regiment was a unit of volunteers recruited in Louisiana that fought in the Confederate States Army during the American Civil War. It served only in the Western Theater. The unit was created in November 1862 by combining the veteran but diminished 13th Louisiana and 20th Louisiana Infantry Regiments to form the consolidated regiment. The regiment fought at Stones River, Jackson, Chickamauga, and Missionary Ridge in 1863. The 13th-20th Louisiana fought at Resaca, New Hope Church, Ezra Church, Jonesborough, and Nashville in 1864. The consolidation was discontinued in February 1865 and the 13th and 20th Infantry Regiments were re-consolidated with other units.

== Formation ==
On 30 November 1862 at Shelbyville, Tennessee, General Braxton Bragg ordered the 13th and 20th Louisiana Infantry Regiments to be consolidated because of the heavy losses suffered by both units. First, each regiment reorganized into five companies. The 13th and 20th were then combined into a consolidated regiment totaling ten companies with an aggregate strength of 1,075 officers and men. Even though the two regiments merged, the officers in each regiment continued to be promoted as if the regiments were separated. The field officers were Colonel Randall L. Gibson, Lieutenant Colonel Leon Von Zinken, and Major Charles Guillet. On 2 January 1863, Guillet was mortally wounded and replaced as major by Francis L. Campbell. Gibson became the brigade commander on 20 September 1863 and was replaced as colonel by Von Zinken. At that time, Campbell became lieutenant colonel and Samuel L. Bishop was promoted major. Gibson was promoted brigadier general on 11 January 1864. Von Zinken retired in November 1864 and was replaced as colonel by Campbell while Edgar M. Dubroca became lieutenant colonel.

Company captains for the 13th-20th Consolidated Louisiana Infantry Regiment
Company	Original Regiment	Captains
A	20th Louisiana	Albert A. Lipscomb
B	13th Louisiana	Edgar Dubroca (p); E. J. Blasco (k-Resaca)
C	13th Louisiana	George Norton (z); J. B. Lallande
D	20th Louisiana	Samuel L. Bishop (p); Theodore Eichholtz (m-Chattanooga); Samuel Sutter
E	13th Louisiana	John McGrath
F	20th Louisiana	Robert L. Keene (c); Gebhard Kehrwald (ds); Robert L. Keene
G	20th Louisiana	H. Brummerstadt (k-Stones River); Theodore Schneider (k-Chickamauga); Alexander Dresel
H	20th Louisiana	Thomas M. Ryan (m-Stones River); Adolphus Webre (k-Ezra Church); John D. Caulfeld
I	13th Louisiana	John M. King (c-Stones River); Britton Bennett (ds); John M. King (r); William P. Richardson
K	13th Louisiana	John W. Labousse (u); Arthur L. Stuart

- Key: c = captured, ds = deserted/absent, k = killed, m = mortally wounded, p = promoted, r = resigned, u = unknown, z = became brigade assistant adjutant general Feb. 1864.

== Service ==
=== 1862–1863 ===
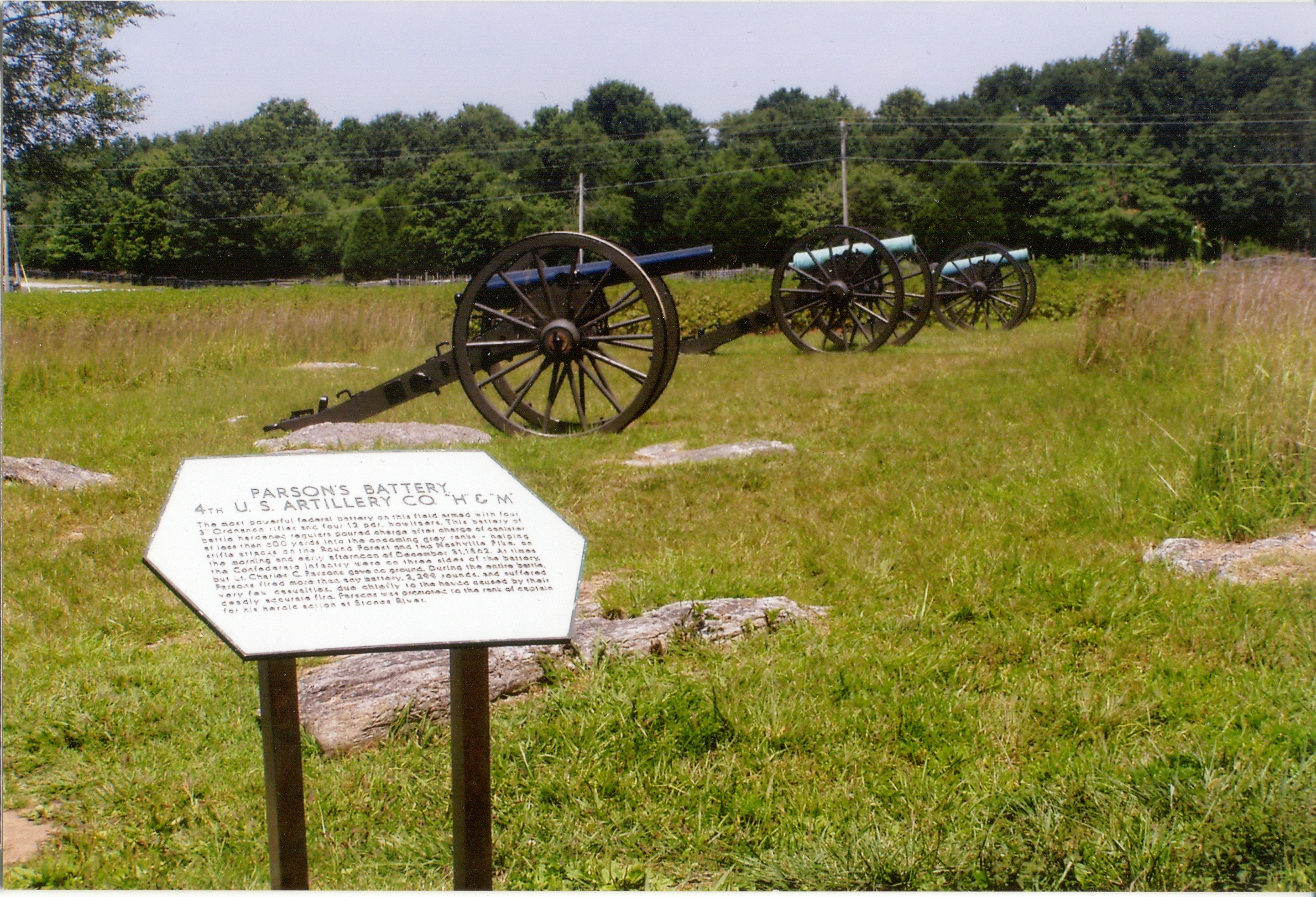
The Confederate attack on 2 January 1863 was stopped by massed Union artillery.

The consolidated regiment fought at the Battle of Stones River. A total of 187 men were killed, wounded, or missing on 31 December 1862, while 129 became casualties on 2 January 1863. Major Guillet and Captain Brummerstadt (Company G) were killed on 2 January and Captain Ryan (Company H) died from his wounds on 20 January. Winning placement on the Roll of Honor for gallant conduct were 22 men from the consolidated regiment. At Stones River, the 13th-20th Louisiana Infantry was in Adams' brigade, Major General John C. Breckinridge's division, Hardee's Corps, Bragg's Army of Tennessee. The other units in Adams' brigade were the 14th Louisiana Infantry Battalion, the 16th-25th Louisiana and 32nd Alabama Infantry Regiments, and the 5th Company of the Washington Artillery. Adams' brigade lost a total of 112 killed, 445 wounded, and 146 missing during the battle.

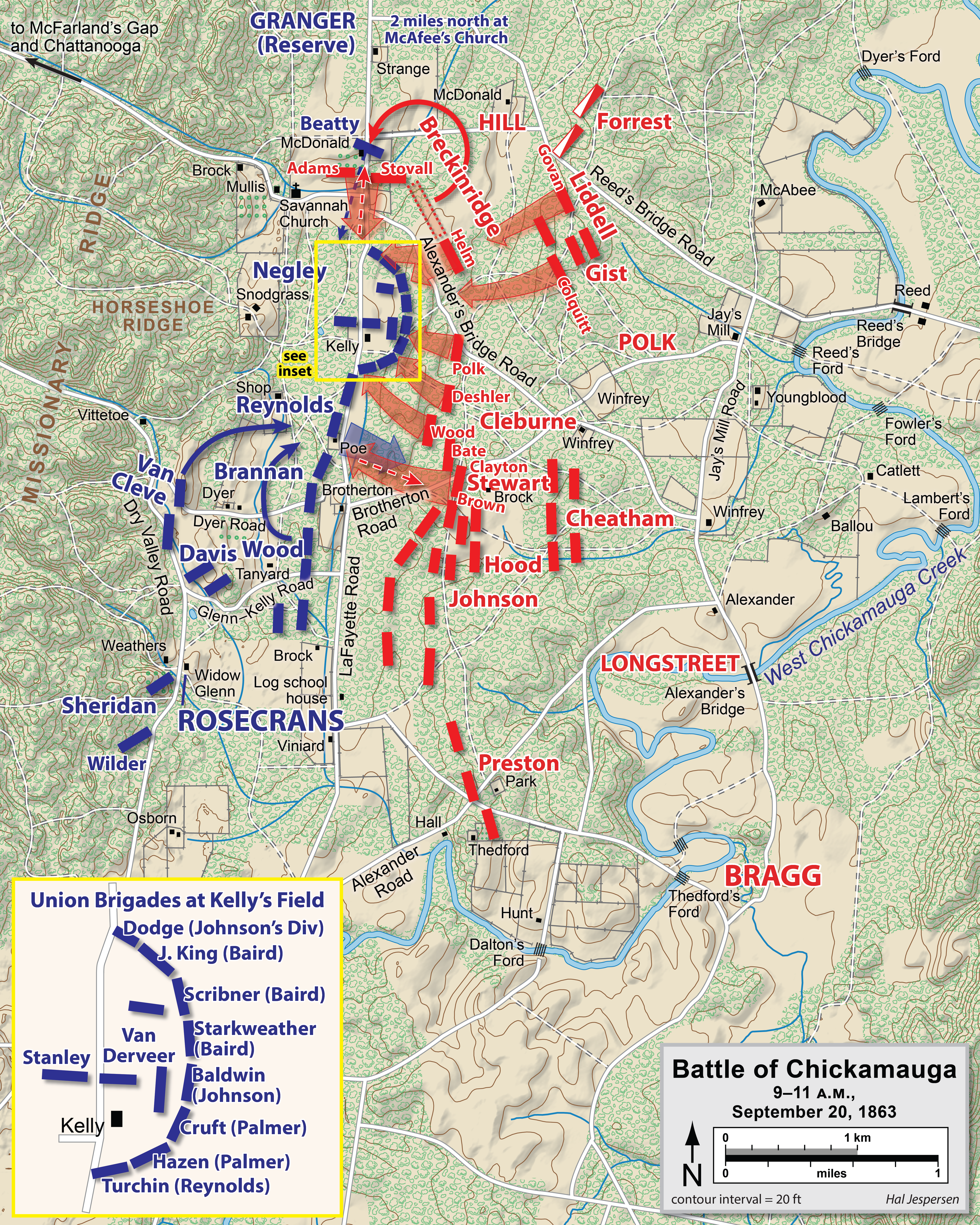
Battle of Chickamauga map shows the attack of Adams' brigade (top of map) toward the south.

At 2:00 pm on 31 December, Bragg ordered Breckinridge to attack the Round Forest, which had become a Federal strongpoint. Previously two Confederate brigades had unsuccessfully attacked the position. The fences and terrain of the Cowan Farm proved difficult to navigate. The 13th-20th Louisiana first had to file through the farm, then move to take position on the brigade's right flank. When Adams' troops attacked, they became the target of four Union batteries. As the 13th-20th Louisiana advanced, it was hit in its exposed right flank by two Indiana regiments who overran and captured 78 Confederates. Within a half-hour, Adams' brigade was beaten back with the loss of 426 men killed and wounded. On 2 January, Breckinridge's division was again called upon to assault the Union forces posted on the east bank of Stones River. Adams' brigade formed on the left in the second line. At first, the attack drove back the Union defenders, but when the pursuing Confederates approached the river, they found themselves the target of 45 Federal cannons. The ensuing barrage routed Breckinridge's soldiers.

The 13th-20th Louisiana Infantry went into winter quarters near Tullahoma, Tennessee. In May 1863 the regiment transferred to General Joseph E. Johnston's army at Jackson, Mississippi. On 5–25 July, it served during the Siege of Jackson before withdrawing to Morton, Mississippi. In August, the regiment returned to Bragg's Army of Tennessee where it fought in the Battle of Chickamauga on 19–20 September. At Chickamauga, the regiment was in Adams' brigade, Breckinridge's division, Lieutenant General Daniel Harvey Hill's corps. Adams' brigade suffered 429 casualties in the fighting. Adams was wounded and captured, and Gibson assumed command of the brigade. The same units were in the brigade as at Stones River, with the addition of the 19th Louisiana Infantry Regiment and the subtraction of the artillery. At 11 am on the second day, Adams' brigade and another brigade broke through the Federal left flank. Gibson reported that the 13th-20th Louisiana captured 80 Federals. When Adams' troops advanced directly into the Union rear, they were struck without warning by a point-blank volley from a brigade of Union troops concealed in the woods. After bitter fighting, the two Confederate brigades were forced to retreat. Captain Schneider was killed at Chickamauga. Gibson stated that the regiment took "275 muskets" into action and Von Zinken reported losses of 16 killed, 64 wounded, and 44 missing.

On 25 November 1863 at the Battle of Missionary Ridge, the 13th-20th Louisiana Infantry was part of Gibson's brigade, Major General Alexander P. Stewart's division, Breckinridge's corps. The Alabama regiment was replaced by the 4th Louisiana Infantry Battalion, otherwise the brigade was the same as at Chickamauga. The brigade lost 28 killed, 96 wounded, and 233 missing. Breckinridge did not order the top of the ridge entrenched until the night on 23 November. When the trenches were hurriedly dug, they were placed on the crest, rather than on the forward slope, where they would have been more effective. Bragg and Breckinridge also insisted on holding rifle pits at the base of the ridge which meant that the defenders had two weak lines rather than one strong one. Finally, the Confederate commanders had no reserve to plug a gap in the line. When the Federals broke through the defenses to Gibson's right, his brigade was hit in front and flank, and disintegrated.

=== 1864–1865 ===
The 13th-20th Louisiana Infantry spent the winter of 1863–1864 in camp near Dalton, Georgia before serving in the Atlanta campaign. The regiment was part of Gibson's brigade, Stewart's division, Lieutenant General John Bell Hood's corps, General Joseph E. Johnston's Army of Tennessee. In addition to the 16th-25th and 19th Louisiana Infantry Regiments and the 4th and 14th Infantry Battalions, Gibson's brigade included the 1st Louisiana Regulars, 4th Louisiana, and 30th Louisiana Infantry Regiments. The 13th-20th Louisiana fought at the Battle of Resaca on 14–15 May 1864, Battle of New Hope Church on 25 May, and Battle of Ezra Church on 28 July. Captain Blasco was killed at Resaca, while Captain Webre was killed at Ezra Church.

At Resaca, Stewart's division attacked and was bloodily repulsed with 1,000 casualties. Gibson's brigade in the second line was recalled before it became seriously involved. At New Hope Church. part of Gibson's brigade came into action to help repulse Union attackers. At the Battle of Atlanta, Gibson's brigade was in Major General Henry D. Clayton's division, Major General Benjamin F. Cheatham's corps, Hood's Army of Tennessee. In a confusion of orders, Gibson's brigade was left out of the battle. At Ezra Church, one of Lieutenant General Stephen D. Lee's staff officers committed Gibson's brigade to battle without consulting either Clayton or Gibson. Despite their misgivings, the Louisianans advanced on the Union entrenchments atop the hill, but they were quickly pinned down. They endured heavy fire for an hour, but after a brigade sent to their support fled, Clayton ordered Gibson's brigade to retreat. At Ezra Church, Gibson's brigade suffered 480 casualties. This was 50% casualties, which occurred a second time on 31 August at the Battle of Jonesborough while attacking entrenched Federals.

The 13th-20th Louisiana Infantry took part in the Franklin–Nashville campaign, serving in Gibson's brigade, Clayton's division, S. D. Lee's corps. Gibson's brigade was composed of the same units as in the Atlanta campaign. On 29 October 1864, Gibson's brigade forced Federal cavalry to abandon Florence, Alabama. On 30 November, the regiment arrived too late to fight in the Battle of Franklin. On 15 December in the Battle of Nashville, Gibson's brigade formed the rearguard after part of Hood's army fled. On 16 December, Hood's army was routed again, and this time Gibson's brigade was unable to stop Union pursuers. After losing about 100 men during the retreat, Gibson's brigade, reduced to 500 men, tried to defend the bridge at Franklin, Tennessee, on 17 December. Union cavalry enveloped the brigade, but Gibson's men managed to fight their way out at the cost of 40 more casualties.

In February 1865, the 13th-20th Louisiana Infantry was discontinued. The 13th Regiment was consolidated with the 4th and 30th Louisiana Infantry Regiments and the 14th Louisiana Infantry Battalion. The 20th Regiment was consolidated with the 1st Louisiana Regulars and the 16th Louisiana Infantry Regiments.

== See also ==
- List of Louisiana Confederate Civil War units
- Louisiana in the Civil War
