= 16th Louisiana Infantry Regiment =

Infantry regiment of the Confederate States Army

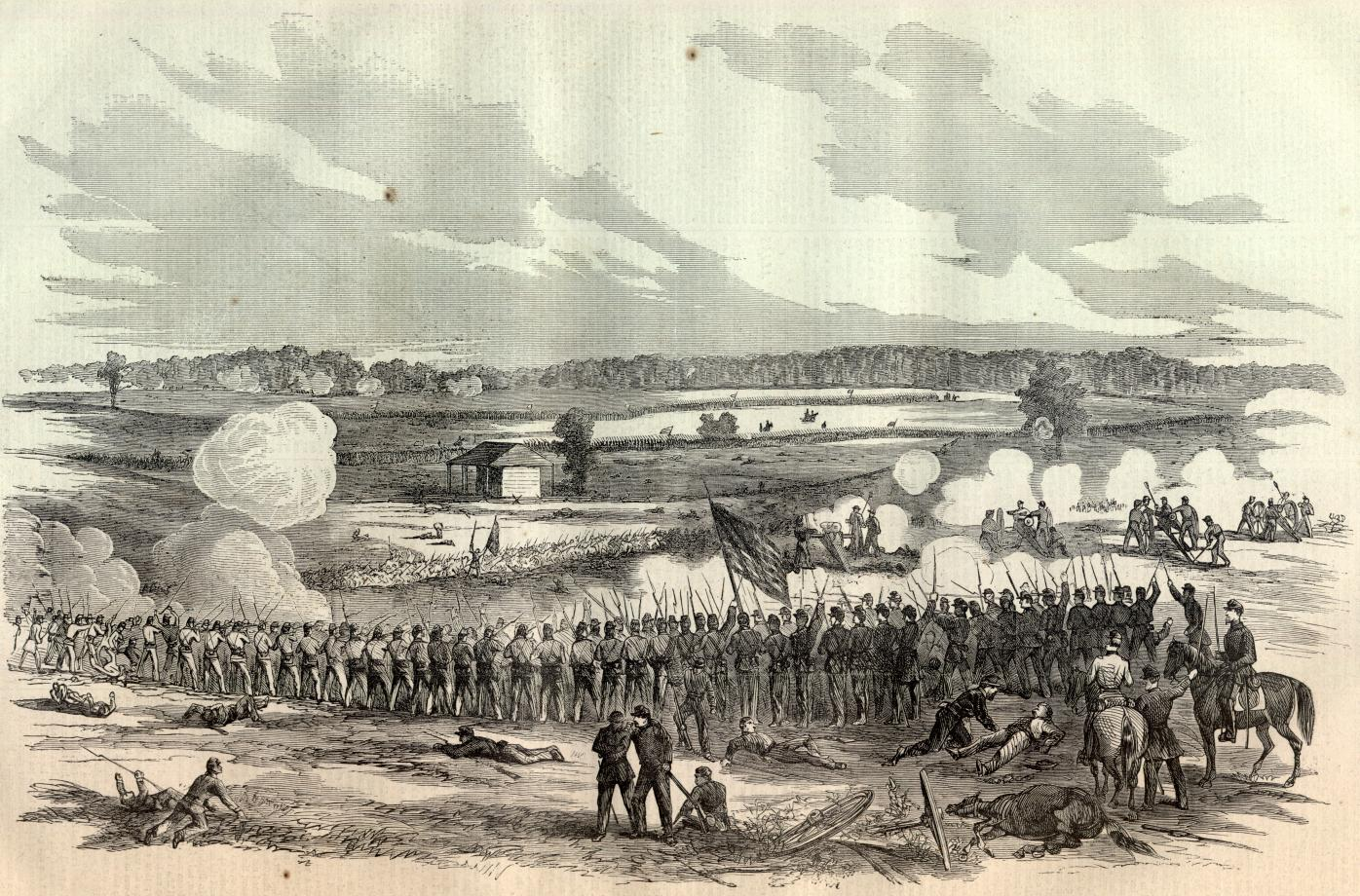
- The regiment fought at the Battle of Perryville, shown here.
- Active: 29 September 1861 – 8 May 1865
- Country: Confederate States of America
- Allegiance: Confederate States of America, Louisiana
- Branch: Confederate States Army
- Type: Infantry
- Size: Regiment (851 men, Sept. 1861)
- Part of: Adams', Gibson's Brigade
- Engagements: American Civil War; Battle of Shiloh (1862); Siege of Corinth (1862); Battle of Perryville (1862); Battle of Stones River (1862–63); Jackson Expedition (1863); Battle of Chickamauga (1863); Battle of Missionary Ridge (1863); Battle of Resaca (1864); Battle of New Hope Church (1864); Battle of Atlanta (1864); Battle of Ezra Church (1864); Battle of Jonesborough (1864); Battle of Nashville (1864); Battle of Spanish Fort (1865)

Commanders
- Notable commanders: Preston Pond Jr.

The 16th Louisiana Infantry Regiment was a unit of volunteers recruited in Louisiana that fought in the Confederate States Army during the American Civil War. The regiment organized in September 1861 and served during the war in the Western Theater of the American Civil War. The regiment fought at Shiloh, Corinth, and Perryville in 1862. In November 1862, the regiment was consolidated with the 25th Louisiana Infantry Regiment and served at Stones River, Jackson, Chickamauga, and Missionary Ridge in 1863. The unit fought at Resaca, New Hope Church, Atlanta, Ezra Church, Jonesborough, and Nashville in 1864. The consolidation with the 25th Louisiana was discontinued in February 1865 and the regiment was re-consolidated with the 1st Louisiana Regulars and 20th Louisiana Infantry Regiments. The unit fought its final battle at Spanish Fort. The regiment was again consolidated into the Chalmette Regiment shortly before surrendering in May 1865.

== See also ==
- List of Louisiana Confederate Civil War units
- Louisiana in the Civil War
