= 25th Louisiana Infantry Regiment =

Infantry regiment of the Confederate States Army

- Active: 26 March 1862 – 8 May 1865
- Country: Confederate States of America
- Allegiance: Confederate States of America, Louisiana
- Branch: Confederate States Army
- Type: Infantry
- Size: Regiment
- Part of: Adams', Gibson's Brigade
- Engagements: American Civil War; Siege of Corinth (1862); Battle of Perryville (1862); Battle of Stones River (1862–63); Jackson Expedition (1863); Battle of Chickamauga (1863); Battle of Missionary Ridge (1863); Battle of Rocky Face Ridge (1864); Battle of Resaca (1864); Battle of New Hope Church (1864); Battle of Atlanta (1864); Battle of Ezra Church (1864); Battle of Jonesborough (1864); Battle of Nashville (1864); Battle of Spanish Fort (1865)

Commanders
- Notable commanders: Stuart W. Fisk

The 25th Louisiana Infantry Regiment was a unit of volunteers recruited in Louisiana that fought in the Confederate States Army during the American Civil War. The regiment organized in March 1862 at New Orleans and served during the war in the Western Theater of the American Civil War. The regiment served at First Corinth and Perryville in 1862. In November 1862, the regiment was consolidated with the 16th Louisiana Infantry Regiment and served at Stones River, Jackson, Chickamauga, and Missionary Ridge in 1863. The 16th-25th Consolidated Louisiana Infantry fought at Mill Creek Gap, Resaca, New Hope Church, Atlanta, Ezra Church, Jonesborough, and Nashville in 1864. The consolidation with the 16th Louisiana was discontinued in February 1865 and the regiment was re-consolidated with the 4th Louisiana Infantry Battalion. The new unit fought its last battle at Spanish Fort. The unit again re-consolidated, becoming two companies of the Pelican Regiment before surrendering in May 1865.

== See also ==
- List of Louisiana Confederate Civil War units
- Louisiana in the Civil War
