= 30th Louisiana Infantry Regiment =

Infantry regiment of the Confederate States Army

30th Louisiana Infantry Regiment 30th Louisiana Infantry Battalion
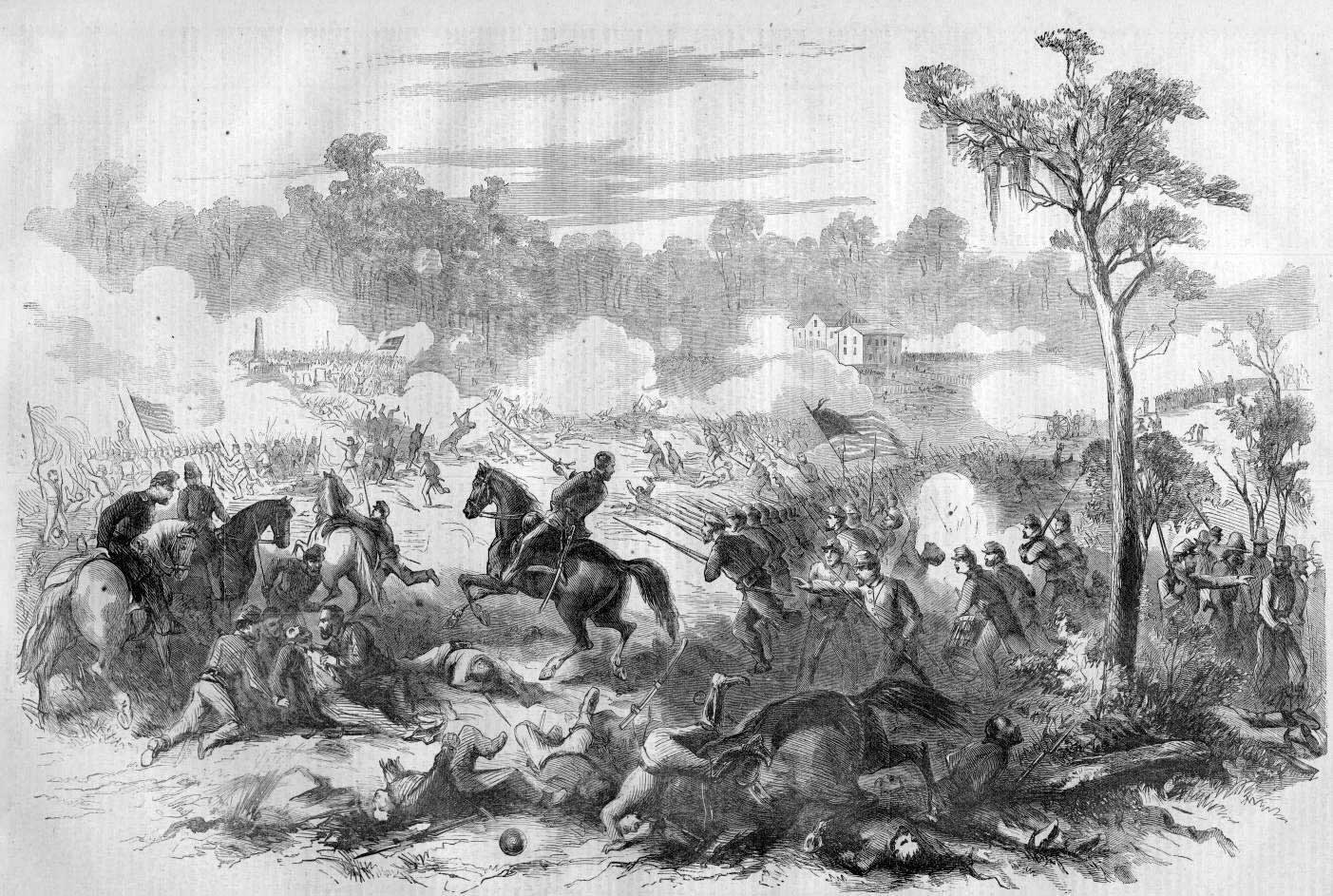
- The regiment received its baptism of fire at the Battle of Baton Rouge on 5 August 1862.
- Active: 17 December 1861 – 8 May 1865
- Country: Confederate States of America
- Allegiance: Louisiana
- Branch: Confederate States Army
- Type: Infantry
- Size: Regiment, later Battalion
- Part of: Gibson's Brigade
- Nickname: Sumter Regiment
- Engagements: American Civil War; Capture of New Orleans (1862); Battle of Baton Rouge (1862); Siege of Port Hudson (1863); Jackson Expedition (1863); Battle of New Hope Church (1864); Battle of Atlanta (1864); Battle of Ezra Church (1864); Battle of Nashville (1864); Battle of Spanish Fort (1865)

Commanders
- Notable commanders: Thomas Shields

The 30th Louisiana Infantry Regiment was a unit of volunteers recruited in Louisiana that fought in the Confederate States Army during the American Civil War. On 17 December 1861, the Sumter Regiment was accepted into state service at New Orleans. On 1 March 1862, the militia regiment transferred to Confederate service for a 90-day enlistment. At the Capture of New Orleans on 25 April, three and a half companies stayed in the city and were captured. The other companies went to Camp Moore where the regiment reorganized for Confederate service on 15 May 1862, by the addition of four more companies. Company K left on furlough and never returned. The regiment fought at Baton Rouge before being assigned to garrison Port Hudson. On 4 March 1863, two companies were suppressed and their men reassigned to other companies, officially reducing the regiment to a 7-company unit named the 30th Louisiana Infantry Battalion. However, contemporary records often continued to refer to the unit as a regiment. A detachment was captured at the Siege of Port Hudson, but the bulk of the battalion served at Jackson in 1863, and New Hope Church, Atlanta, Ezra Church, and Nashville in 1864. The survivors were consolidated with the remnants of the 4th and 13th Louisiana Infantry Regiments, and the 14th Louisiana Battalion in February 1864. The men fought at Spanish Fort in March and April 1865, and surrendered in May 1865.

== See also ==
- List of Louisiana Confederate Civil War units
- Louisiana in the Civil War
