= 11th Louisiana Infantry Regiment =

Infantry regiment of the Confederate States Army

- Active: 13 August 1861 – 19 August 1862
- Country: Confederate States of America
- Allegiance: Louisiana
- Branch: Confederate States Army
- Type: Infantry
- Size: Regiment (857 men, August 1861)
- Engagements: American Civil War; Battle of Belmont (1861); Battle of Island Number Ten (1862); Battle of Shiloh (1862); Siege of Corinth (1862)

Commanders
- Notable commanders: Samuel F. Marks

The 11th Louisiana Infantry Regiment was a unit of foot soldiers from Louisiana that fought in the Confederate States Army during the American Civil War. The regiment fought at Belmont in 1861 and Island Number Ten, Shiloh, and Corinth in 1862. By this time its numbers were seriously reduced, so the regiment was disbanded in August 1862. The survivors mostly transferred to the 13th Louisiana and 20th Louisiana Infantry Regiments, but a few soldiers became part of the 14th Louisiana Sharpshooter Battalion.
