= 4th Louisiana Infantry Regiment =

Infantry regiment of the Confederate States Army

4th Louisiana Infantry Regiment (Confederate)
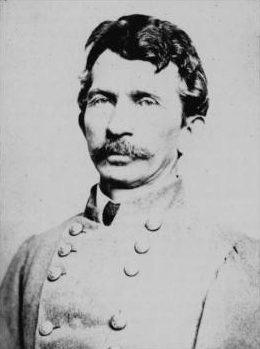
- Henry W. Allen was the regiment's second colonel.
- Active: 25 May 1861 – 12 May 1865
- Country: Confederate States of America
- Allegiance: Confederate States of America, Louisiana
- Branch: Confederate States Army
- Type: Infantry
- Size: Regiment (862 men, May 1861)
- Part of: Gibson's Brigade
- Engagements: American Civil War; Battle of Shiloh (1862); Battle of Baton Rouge (1862); Siege of Port Hudson (1863); Siege of Jackson (1863); Battle of New Hope Church (1864); Battle of Peachtree Creek (1864); Battle of Ezra Church (1864); Battle of Jonesborough (1864); Battle of Nashville (1864); Battle of Spanish Fort (1865)

Commanders
- Notable commanders: Henry Watkins Allen

The 4th Louisiana Infantry Regiment was a unit of volunteers recruited in Louisiana that fought in the Confederate States Army during the American Civil War. Formed in May 1861, the regiment served in the Western Theater of the American Civil War. The unit fought at Shiloh and Baton Rouge in 1862 and at Jackson in 1863. A detachment served during the Siege of Port Hudson and was captured. In 1864, the regiment fought in the Atlanta campaign where it lost heavily at Jonesborough. At Nashville in December 1864 most of the men were captured. The survivors were consolidated with several other units and fought at Spanish Fort in April 1865. The remnant surrendered in May 1865.

== Formation ==
On 25 May 1861, the 4th Louisiana Infantry Regiment organized at Camp Moore with the strength of 862 men. The field officers were Colonel Robert J. Barrow, Lieutenant Colonel Henry Watkins Allen, and Major Samuel E. Hunter. Barrow resigned on 21 March 1862 and was replaced as colonel by Allen. At that time, Hunter was promoted lieutenant colonel and Thomas E. Vick became major. When the regiment elected new officers on 19 May 1862, Vick was dropped and William F. Pennington became major. The original Company G transferred to Company E of the 9th Battalion Partisan Rangers in May 1862. Company K was added on 29 May 1862. The companies were originally numbered differently, but the final company organization is listed in the table.

Company information for the 4th Louisiana Infantry Regiment
Company	Nickname	Captains	Recruitment Parish
A	Hunter Rifles Company A	Edward J. Pullen (p); A. T. Feister (k-Jonesborough)	East Feliciana
B	National Guards	Henry A. Rauhman (r); Charles Betz (x); Robert L. Pruyn (z); David Devall	East Baton Rouge
C	Lake Providence Cadets	Franc Whicher (d); William F. Pennington (p); Charles R. Purdy (k-Jackson)	Carroll
D	West Feliciana Rifles	Charles Tooraen (k-Shiloh); Resin B. Turner (r); James Reid	West Feliciana
E	Lafourche Guards	Thomas E. Vick (p); Peter E. Lorio	Lafourche
F	Delta Rifles	H. M. Favrot (r); O. P. Skolfield	West Baton Rouge
G #1	Beaver Creek Rifles	James H. Wingfield	St. Helena
G #2	Hunter Rifles Company B	John T. Hilliard (k-Shiloh); Cader R. Cornelius	East Feliciana
H	West Baton Rouge Tirailleurs	F. A. Williams (x); Sosthene Aillet (r); Trasimond Landry	West Baton Rouge
I	St. Helena Rifles	John B. Taylor (k-Shiloh); J. K. Womack (z); C. E. Kennon	St. Helena
K	Packwood Guards	George H. Packwood	St. Helena

- Key: d = died, k = killed, p = promoted, r = resigned, x = dropped on 19 May 1862, z = dropped in May 1864.

== Service ==
=== 1861–1862 ===
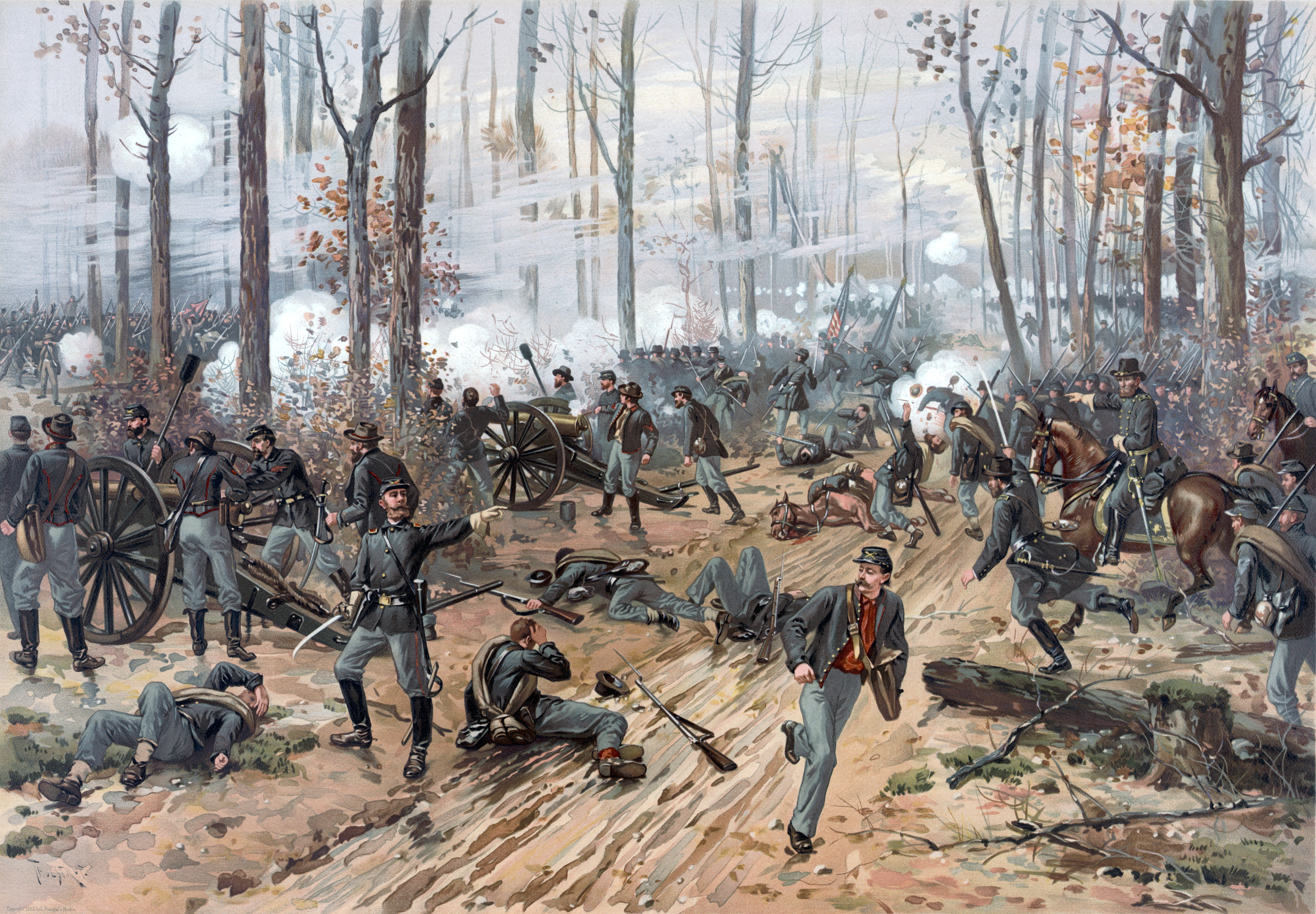
Battle of Shiloh: Fighting at the Hornet's Nest

After the 4th Louisiana Infantry was formed, it received orders to travel to the Gulf Coast of the United States. The summer of 1861 was spent in camps at Biloxi, Mississippi City, Pascagoula, and Pass Christian, Mississippi, as well as at Ship Island. After Ship Island was abandoned in September, the regiment moved to Brashear City and Franklin, Louisiana, in order to protect Bayou Teche and the Atchafalaya River. The unit traveled to Jackson, Tennessee, in February 1862 to join General P. G. T. Beauregard's forces. A Union army under Major General Ulysses S. Grant massed on the Tennessee River at Pittsburg Landing while a second army under Major General Don Carlos Buell marched from Nashville to join it. To counter these moves, Beauregard concentrated 5,000 men from Louisiana under Brigadier General Daniel Ruggles and other troops at Corinth, Mississippi. After being joined by General Albert Sidney Johnston, the Confederate army numbered about 40,000 soldiers.

The 4th Louisiana Infantry fought at the Battle of Shiloh on 6–7 April 1862, suffering 209 casualties out of the 575 men taken into action. The dead included Captains Tooraen (Company D), Hilliard (Company G), and Taylor (Company I). The regiment was assigned to Colonel Randall L. Gibson's 1st Brigade, Ruggles' 1st Division, Major General Braxton Bragg's Second Corps. The other units in Gibson's brigade were the 13th Louisiana, 19th Louisiana, and 1st Arkansas Infantry Regiments. Gibson's brigade sustained losses of 97 killed, 488 wounded, and 97 missing. As the Confederate assault rolled forward, Gibson's brigade was in the second line. At one point, a Confederate officer with a captured U.S. flag rode past the regiment and soldiers from the 4th Louisiana fired on him, inadvertently hitting other nearby friendly units. The other Confederates fired back and Colonel Allen later remarked that this friendly fire accident was a "terrible blow to the regiment". Later in the battle, Gibson's brigade made three or four unsuccessful assaults on a Union position called the Hornet's Nest. Allen was wounded in the cheek at this time. On the second day, Gibson's brigade was placed with Brigadier General Patton Anderson's brigade to its right and Brigadier General Patrick Cleburne's brigade to its left.

On 2 May 1862, the 4th Louisiana Infantry traveled to Edward's Station, Mississippi. From 18 May to 27 July, the regiment was part of the garrison of Vicksburg, Mississippi. In late July, the unit moved to Camp Moore to join the forces of Major General John C. Breckinridge. On 5 August 1862, the regiment participated in the Battle of Baton Rouge in which it sustained 42 casualties. During the fighting, the 4th Louisiana seized two Union cannons, but they were soon recaptured by the 6th Michigan Infantry Regiment which also took the regiment's flag. The 4th Louisiana was part of the 2nd Brigade in Ruggles' 2nd Division. Since Colonel Allen commanded the brigade, the regiment was led by Lieutenant Colonel Hunter. The other units in the brigade were the 30th Louisiana Battalion, Stewart's Louisiana Legion, and Captain Oliver J. Semmes' 1st Louisiana Regular Battery. The brigade lost 28 killed, 91 wounded, and 47 missing, including Allen badly wounded. (Note: Stewart's Legion was reorganized as the 9th Louisiana Battalion before 2 July 1862.) The regiment occupied Port Hudson, Louisiana, and began building fortifications there in fall and winter 1862.

=== 1863–1865 ===
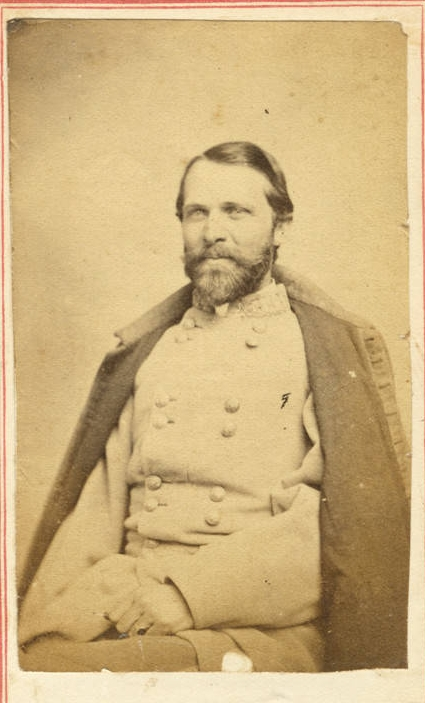
Randall L. Gibson

Colonel Allen was promoted brigadier general on 19 January 1863. On that date, Hunter became colonel, Pennington was promoted lieutenant colonel, and Edward J. Pullen became major. The regiment stayed at Port Hudson through spring 1863, when it was ordered to march against Grierson's Raid on 1 May. A detachment, consisting mostly of C Company stayed behind and served during the Siege of Port Hudson from 23 May to 9 July. Captain Purdy (Company C) was killed on 26 June 1863, probably during the siege. The 4th Louisiana Infantry joined Major General William Wing Loring's division before transferring to Major General Samuel Gibbs French's division. The regiment served in Brigadier General Samuel B. Maxey's brigade. It participated in the Siege of Jackson on 5–25 July before retreating to Morton, Mississippi. In fall and winter 1863, the unit was assigned to defend Mobile, Alabama. In December 1863, the regiment joined the Army of Tennessee at Dalton, Georgia. In February 1864, it was sent back to Mobile, but it returned to the Army of Tennessee in May.

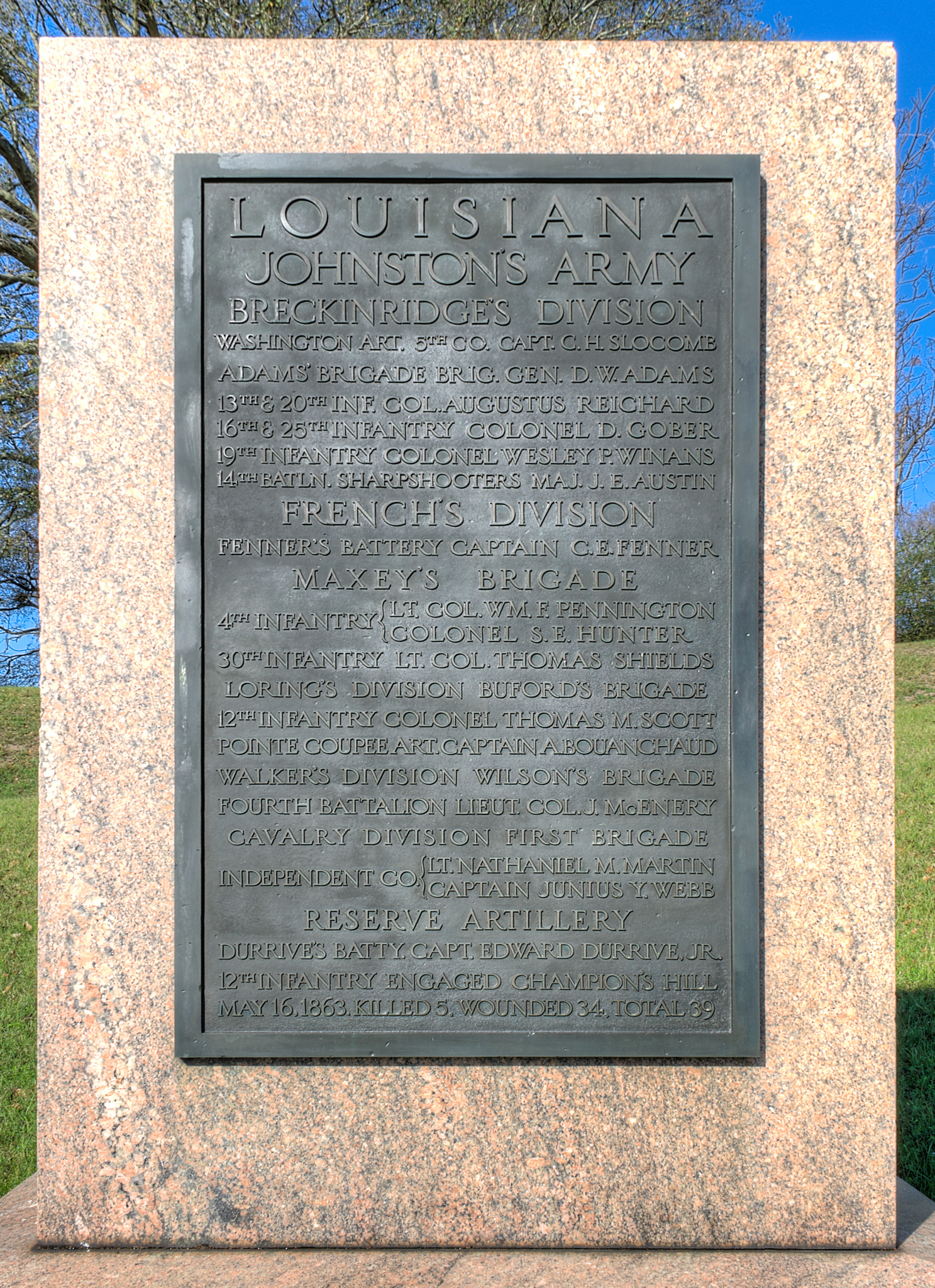
Plaque at Vicksburg National Military Park shows Louisiana units that served in Gen. Joseph E. Johnston's army during the Vicksburg campaign. The list includes the 4th Louisiana in Maxey's brigade.

During the early part of the Atlanta campaign, the 4th Louisiana Infantry was assigned to Brigadier General William Andrew Quarles' brigade, Major General Edward C. Walthall's division, Lieutenant General Leonidas Polk's corps. The other units in the brigade were the 42nd, 46th-55th, 48th, 49th, and 53rd Tennessee, 30th Louisiana, and 1st Alabama Infantry Regiments. Quarles' brigade arrived in theater on 26 May 1864 with 2,200 men. The regiment saw action in the fighting around New Hope Church on 27 May. The 4th Louisiana was reassigned to Gibson's brigade on 19 July. Gibson (now a brigadier general) led a Louisiana brigade in Major General Henry D. Clayton's division, Lieutenant General Stephen Dill Lee's corps. The other units in Gibson's brigade were the 1st Regulars, 13th, 16th-25th, 19th, 20th, and 30th Louisiana Regiments and the 4th and 14th Louisiana Battalions. (Note: Major General Benjamin F. Cheatham temporarily led Lee's corps on 20 July 1864.) On 20 July, the regiment took part in the Battle of Peachtree Creek.

On 28 July, the 4th Louisiana Infantry Regiment fought at the Battle of Ezra Church. S. D. Lee ordered an assault on the Union forces near Ezra Church, and when his first division's attack was repulsed, he issued orders for Clayton's division to charge. Without consulting Clayton, Lee's messenger ordered Gibson's brigade to attack. After noting that their Federal opponents were entrenched, Gibson's soldiers went to ground and opened fire. Seeing that his men suffered severely from the Union defensive fire, Gibson asked for help. Clayton ordered another brigade forward, but it dissolved when it came under fire. Therefore, Clayton suspended the attack and pulled Gibson's brigade back out of range. Altogether, Gibson's brigade sustained 480 casualties. On 31 August, the regiment fought at the Battle of Jonesborough in which the 4th Louisiana Regiment suffered 64 casualties out of the 104 men taken into action, including Captain Feister (A Company) killed. Lee ordered his corps to attack well-intrenched Federals and after a short bombardment, the troops went forward. In the one-sided debacle, Lee's attack was immediately stopped with 1,400 casualties, whereas Union losses numbered only 172.

For the Franklin-Nashville campaign, the regiment was consolidated with the 30th Louisiana. The unit was in reserve at the Battle of Franklin on 30 November 1864. At the Battle of Nashville on 15–16 December, the regiment was in Gibson's brigade, organized the same as it was after 19 July (see above). On the first day of battle, Lieutenant General Alexander P. Stewart's corps was routed. Since Gibson's brigade was immediately to Stewart's right, Gibson swung his troops to face directly west. Because it was almost dark, Confederate General John Bell Hood was able to rally his army on a new defensive line. On the second day, the Confederates were routed again. S. D. Lee ordered elements of Gibson's brigade to block Federal pursuit, but they were simply brushed aside. On the morning of 17 December, the 500 survivors of Gibson's brigade defended a pontoon bridge across the Harpeth River at Franklin, Tennessee. Union cavalry routed the Confederate horsemen opposing them and surrounded Gibson's brigade. Gibson's men fought their way out with the loss of 40 men. Most of the men in the 4th Louisiana Regiment were captured at Nashville or in its aftermath.

Hood's beaten army reassembled at Tupelo, Mississippi, on 12 January 1865. Since there was a shortage of food, Hood devised a system of furloughs for his soldiers. However, many men never returned from furlough. By March 1865, the 4th Louisiana Infantry Regiment mustered only 1 officer and 18 rank and file. These were consolidated with the 13th and 30th Louisiana Infantry Regiments and 14th Louisiana Infantry Battalion and sent to defend Mobile. These soldiers fought at the Battle of Spanish Fort on 27 March – 8 April 1865. After Mobile fell, the soldiers marched to Meridian, Mississippi, where they surrendered on 12 May 1865. During the war, 1,045 men enrolled in the 4th Louisiana Infantry Regiment. Of that total, 155 were killed in action, 60 died of disease, 2 suffered accidental deaths, 2 were murdered, and 1 drowned.

== See also ==
- List of Louisiana Confederate Civil War units
- Louisiana in the Civil War

== Notes ==
Footnotes

Citations
