= 13th Louisiana Infantry Regiment =

Infantry regiment of the Confederate States Army

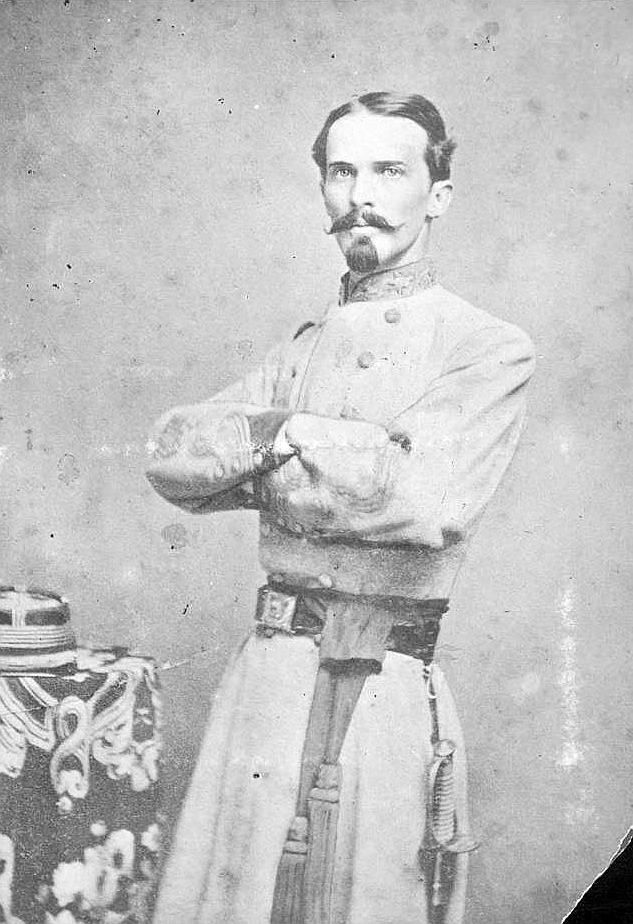
- Randall L. Gibson was the regiment's first colonel. He was later promoted to brigadier general.
- Active: 11 September 1861 – 8 May 1865
- Country: Confederate States of America
- Allegiance: Louisiana
- Branch: Confederate States Army
- Type: Infantry
- Size: Regiment (830 men, Sept. 1861)
- Part of: Adams' and Gibson's Brigade
- Nicknames: Governor's Guards, Avegno Zouaves
- Engagements: American Civil War; Battle of Shiloh (1862); Siege of Corinth (1862); Battle of Perryville (1862); Battle of Stones River (1862–63); Jackson Expedition (1863); Battle of Chickamauga (1863); Battle of Missionary Ridge (1863); Battle of Resaca (1864); Battle of New Hope Church (1864); Battle of Ezra Church (1864); Battle of Nashville (1864); Battle of Spanish Fort (1865)

Commanders
- Notable commanders: Randall L. Gibson

The 13th Louisiana Infantry Regiment was a unit of volunteers recruited in Louisiana that fought in the Confederate States Army during the American Civil War. The unit was created when four infantry companies were added to the Battalion of Governor's Guards in September 1861. It served during the war in the Western Theater of the American Civil War. The regiment fought at Shiloh, Farmington, and Perryville in 1862. After being reduced in numbers, the regiment was consolidated with the 20th Louisiana Infantry Regiment and served at Stones River, Jackson, Chickamauga, and Missionary Ridge in 1863. The 13th-20th Louisiana fought at Resaca, New Hope Church, Ezra Church, and Nashville in 1864. The consolidation with the 20th Louisiana was discontinued in February 1865 and the regiment was re-consolidated with other units. It fought its final battle at Spanish Fort one month before surrendering in May 1865.

== See also ==
- List of Louisiana Confederate Civil War units
- Louisiana in the Civil War
