= Reed N. Weisiger =

American politician

Reed Nelson Weisiger

Texas State Senator

Personal details
- Born: May 2, 1838 Danville, Kentucky, US
- Died: September 12, 1908 (aged 70) Victoria County, Texas, US
- Spouse: Annie Belle Callendar
- Education: Centre College
- Profession: Farmer, Rancher

Military service
- Allegiance: Confederate States
- Branch/service: Confederate States Army
- Rank: Captain
- Unit: Wallers Texas Cavalry
- Battles/wars: American Civil War

Reed Nelson Weisiger (May 2, 1838 – September 12, 1908) was a Texas State Senator from District 26. He was often mentioned for Governor of Texas but he declined to run.

Weisiger was Chairman of the Stock and Stock Raising Committee, as well as eleven other Senate committees. He served in the Legislature from 1891 to 1893.

== Early life and education ==
Weisiger was born in Danville, Kentucky, on May 2, 1838, and attended school there. He completed his education at Centre College, taking a full classical course, and graduated in 1858. He then came to Texas.

== Business, military, and fraternal order ==
Weisiger was a rancher and farmer and raised thoroughbred horses from the Alexander stables of Kentucky. He owned Incommode, which ran in the Kentucky Derby in 1887.

Weisiger served as a cavalry officer in the Confederate States Army during the American Civil War. At the end of the war, he held the rank of captain.

Weisiger was a member of the Masonic Lodge and held the degree of Master Mason.

== Family ==
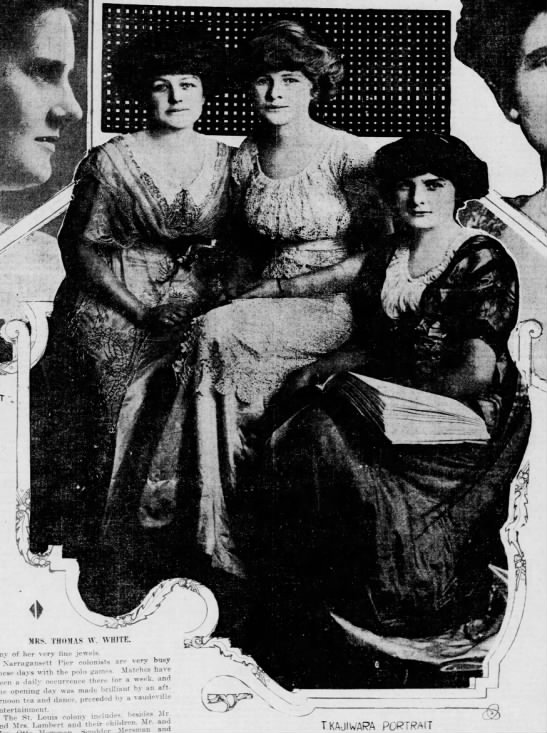
Mrs. Thomas W. White, Lucy Page Weisiger, Elizabeth Weisiger

Weisiger's father was Joseph Weisiger. His mother was Isabella Reed Weisiger a descendant of a Virginia family related to the Clays and Adamses. Weisiger married Annie Belle Callender on June 24, 1874. He and his wife had eight children.

== See also ==
- Daniel Weisiger Adams
