= Ernst Torgler (Medal of Honor) =

- Born: December 28, 1837; Mecklenburg-Schwerin, Germany
- Died: August 3, 1923 (aged 85); Ohio, U.S.
- Burial place: Woodlawn Cemetery (Toledo, Ohio)
- Military career
- Allegiance: United States of America
- Branch: United States Army; Union Army
- Rank: Sergeant
- Units: Company G, 37th Ohio Infantry
- Conflicts: American Civil War: Battle of Ezra Church
- Awards: Medal of Honor

Ernst Torgler (or Ernest R. Torgler) (December 28, 1837 - August 3, 1923) was an American soldier who fought in the American Civil War. Torgler received his country's highest award for bravery during combat, the Medal of Honor. Torgler's medal was won for saving his commanding officer from capture at the Battle of Ezra Church in Georgia, on July 28, 1864. He was honored with the award on May 10, 1894.

Torgler was born in Mecklenburg, Germany, and entered service in Toledo, Ohio, where he was later buried. he died in Ohio 1923

== Medal of Honor citation ==
The President of the United States of America, in the name of Congress, takes pleasure in presenting the Medal of Honor to Sergeant Ernest R. Torgler, United States Army, for extraordinary heroism on 28 July 1864, while serving with Company G, 37th Ohio Infantry, in action at Ezra Chapel, Georgia. At great hazard of his life Sergeant Torgler saved his commanding officer, then badly wounded, from capture.

== See also ==
- List of American Civil War Medal of Honor recipients: T–Z
