= Jackson expedition =

Military campaign during the American Civil War

- Part of the American Civil War
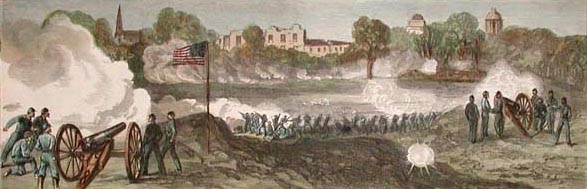
- Siege of Jackson, Mississippi, July 10–16, 1863
Date	July 5–25, 1863 (2 weeks and 6 days)
Location	Near Jackson, Mississippi 32°18′37″N 90°12′13″W
Result	Union victory

Belligerents
United States (Union)	Confederate States

Commanders and leaders
(United States) William Tecumseh Sherman	(Confederate States of America) Joseph E. Johnston

Strength
40,000	30,000

Casualties and losses
129 killed 762 wounded 231 missing	71 killed 504 wounded 25 missing

The Jackson expedition, preceding and related to the siege of Jackson, immediately followed the Confederate surrender of Vicksburg, Mississippi on July 4, 1863, to Union Army Major General Ulysses S. Grant commanding the Union Army of the Tennessee. The Confederate Army of Mississippi at Vicksburg, under the command of Lieutenant General John C. Pemberton, had been isolated in the Vicksburg defenses by Grant's forces since May 18, 1863. The Confederates were under constant artillery bombardment, had to fight off a series of Union Army attacks and could not receive supplies of food and ammunition during the siege.

On May 14, in line with Grant's plan to eliminate other Confederate forces in the area before marching on Vicksburg, a Union force of two corps under Major General William T. Sherman and Major General James B. McPherson drove the Confederates out of Jackson, Mississippi northward toward Canton, Mississippi, about 25 miles away. After this brief Battle of Jackson, Mississippi, McPherson's corps left immediately to rejoin Grant's force while Sherman's corps remained for another day to damage or destroy fortifications, railroad facilities and buildings and supplies of military value.

Johnston returned to Jackson on May 20. Although reinforcements were already arriving, he thought he needed time to receive more reinforcements before attempting to relieve Vicksburg. He tried unsuccessfully to convince Pemberton to abandon Vicksburg and to combine with his force to confront the Union Army while they had similar numbers of men. Johnston's delayed and cautious effort to relieve Pemberton's forces at Vicksburg in the final days of the siege was too late to attempt to lift the siege. Johnston already had concluded that his force was too small to try to relieve Pemberton's army without also being trapped by the Union Army.

When the siege of Vicksburg ended, Johnston's relief force, called by him the “Army of Relief”, was at the Big Black River near Vicksburg. Grant was concerned about a possible attack by Johnston's force against his army and a Confederate attempt to retake Vicksburg. Before Johnston brought his army close to Vicksburg, at Grant's order, Sherman had already deployed the recently arrived IX Corps under Major General John G. Parke and other assigned divisions in an exterior line to defend against attack from outside Vicksburg by another Confederate force. On July 4, the date of the Vicksburg surrender, Grant ordered Sherman to lead an expedition to clear Johnston's forces from the Vicksburg area and to recapture the state capital and railroad center at Jackson. Sherman's corps combined with all or part of three other corps pushed Johnston's force back to Jackson by July 10 under grueling summer conditions. After a few engagements during a brief siege of Jackson, on July 16, Johnston's concern about being trapped and having to surrender his army, caused him to abandon the city. Jackson's military and commercial facilities then were further destroyed by the Union forces. This Union victory helped ensure that Vicksburg, the Mississippi River and Jackson, would remain in the Union's possession for the rest of the war.

== Background ==
In late 1862, the Confederate stronghold at Vicksburg, Mississippi was the last major fortress on the last section of the Mississippi controlled by the Confederacy. After the Battle of Arkansas Post (1863) on January 11, 1863, the Confederates controlled only a 240-mile (386.2-km) stretch of the river from Vicksburg to Port Hudson, Louisiana. The Confederates remained able to block Union shipping over that section of the river and to allow communications and supply between Confederate states east and west of the river, especially at the main transfer point at Vicksburg.

Several attempts to capture Vicksburg overland from Tennessee in December 1862 and by attacking the city from the impassable bayous across the river in Louisiana in early 1863 failed. Grant then devised a plan for a second campaign to capture the city by crossing the Mississippi south of Vicksburg and approaching the city from the south.

== Vicksburg Campaign ==
Army commanders (Vicksburg campaign)
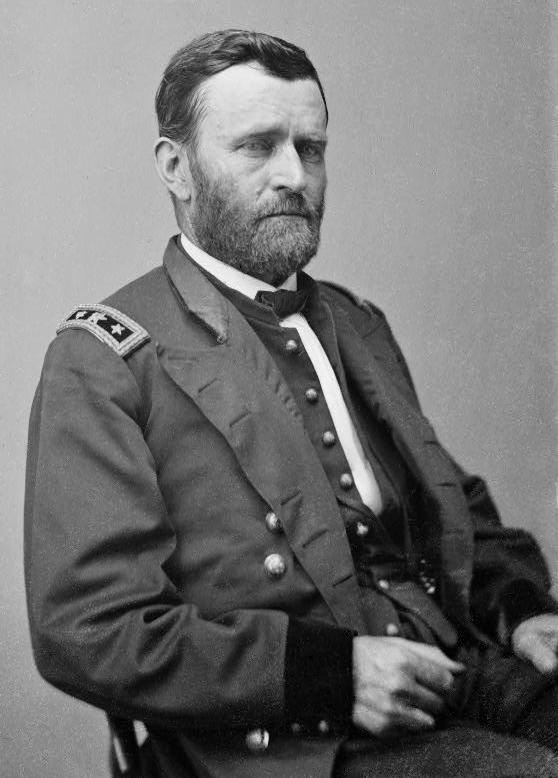
Major General
Ulysses S. Grant, USA

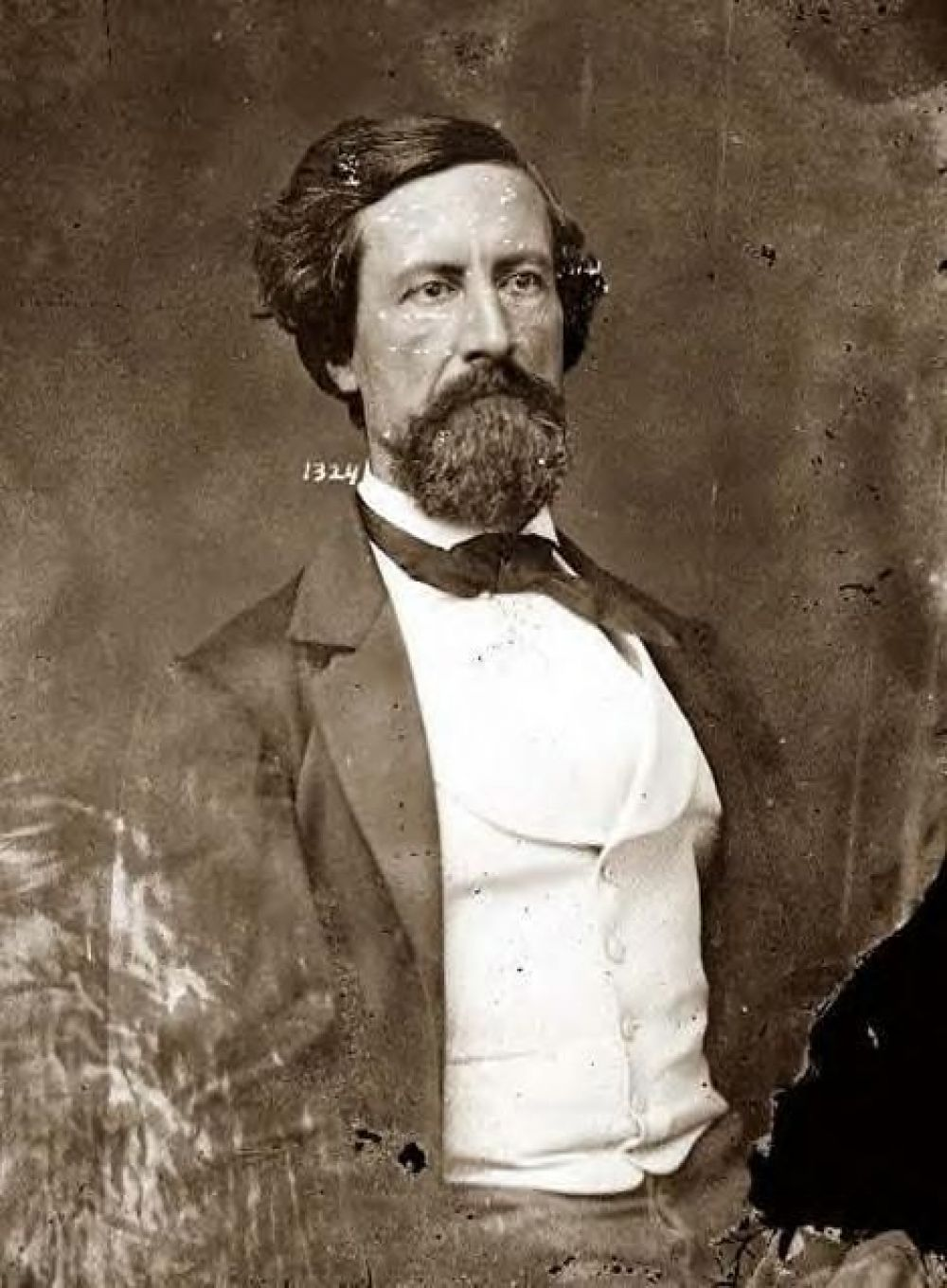
Lieutenant General
John C. Pemberton, CSA

=== Start of the campaign ===
On April 15 and April 22, 1863, Union gunboats, transports and supply vessels ran past the Confederate artillery batteries at Vicksburg from north to south with the loss of one gunboat, one transport with hospital stores and six barges with coal. Grant could now move his army across the river to Mississippi but the Union naval force could not silence all Confederate artillery batteries at Grand Gulf. Grant and Acting Rear Admiral David Dixon Porter decided to move farther south and, with advice from an escaped slave, found a suitable landing at Bruinsburg, Mississippi. Grant's forces successfully crossed the river without Confederate opposition on the night of April 30, 1863 and into the day on May 1.

At the Battle of Port Gibson on May 1, Union forces defeated the heavily outnumbered Confederates under Brigadier General John S. Bowen, causing the abandonment of the Port Gibson defenses and securing the Union position east of the river. The Confederate defenses on the Mississippi at Grand Gulf, Mississippi became untenable with Bowen's defeat and the Confederates also abandoned that position on May 2. Pemberton commanded the Department of Mississippi and East Louisiana from Jackson, Mississippi, 44 miles by railroad west of Vicksburg, from the first week of October 1862 until May 1, 1863. Major General Carter L. Stevenson, a subordinate of Pemberton's, was in command at Vicksburg, including the area between Haines Bluff and Grand Gulf. After Grant's army successfully crossed the Mississippi River from Louisiana at Bruinsburg, Mississippi on April 30-May 1, Pemberton moved his headquarters and three divisions from Jackson to Vicksburg. On May 9, the remaining Confederate garrison of about 6,000 men at Vicksburg came under the direct command of General Joseph E. Johnston, who was in charge of the Confederate Department of the West.

Johnston was ordered to take command of the Mississippi defenses on May 9, but was not given full authority over Pemberton, who, along with General Braxton Bragg and Trans-Mississippi commander Theophilus Holmes, reported directly to Confederate States President Jefferson Davis. Johnston arrived at Jackson on May 13, 1863 to take charge of troops there and to carry out his orders to advise Pemberton. Johnston could only try to persuade Pemberton to act, including to accept Johnston's plan to combine forces to confront Grant in the field.

Grant decided not to take the narrow and rough direct route to Vicksburg but to approach from the east after moving northeast to destroy a portion of the Southern Railroad of Mississippi to prevent supplies and reinforcements moving from Jackson to Vicksburg. Grant also wanted to defeat Pemberton's forces outside the Vicksburg defenses, if possible. On May 12, Union Major General McPherson's XVII Corps defeated a detached Confederate brigade near Jackson at the Battle of Raymond, despite some mismanagement of the battle. McPherson did not pursue Brigadier General John Gregg's brigade back to Jackson.

=== Battle of Jackson ===
Grant was unsure of the size of the Confederate force at Jackson. He decided to eliminate any threat to his army from Confederate forces at Jackson before moving against Pemberton's force. Three divisions led by Pemberton had taken the field to intercept Grant's supply line. Grant ordered Sherman's XV Corps to attack Jackson from the southwest and McPherson's XVII Corps to attack from the northwest. Johnston decided as soon as he arrived that he was too late to hold the city, if not to rescue Pemberton and retain Vicksburg. Without waiting for the imminent arrival of reinforcements, Johnston decided to abandon Jackson with the garrison of 6,000 troops and to regroup at Canton, Mississippi, about 25 miles to the north.

Except for a brief stand by a Confederate rearguard under Brigadier General John Gregg, the Union attack quickly drove Johnston and the remaining garrison from the city at the Battle of Jackson, Mississippi on May 14. The city was surrendered by militia artillerymen and armed civilians. Since Pemberton was moving to the southeast, Johnston's move northward toward Canton took his force farther from Pemberton's force. Grant left Sherman's corps in Jackson with orders to destroy anything of military value. Sherman's men destroyed infrastructure in the city, including factories, warehouses, foundries, railroad tracks, telegraph wires and other property of military or economic value. Sherman's corps left Jackson on May 16, 1863.

=== Battles of Champion Hill and Big Black River Bridge ===
On May 13, 1863, Pemberton led a force of 18,500 men in three divisions from Vicksburg to a point halfway to Jackson. Grant expected to find Johnston's force near Bolton, Mississippi along the Southern Railroad of Mississippi and decided to move his army in that direction. Instead of moving toward Johnston's force, Grant learned that Pemberton was heading toward Bolton to try to cut what he thought was the Union supply line. Pemberton had insufficient supplies and on May 15, he had to wait to move forward for rations and ammunition to be brought up from Vicksburg. Then, because of a bridge washout, Pemberton's men had to cross Baker's Creek upstream and camp east of the creek at Champion Hill. Despite the approach of Grant's entire force early on May 16, Pemberton was unaware of the full threat. The Confederates were soundly defeated at the Battle of Champion Hill, 18 miles west of Jackson, and retreated to Vicksburg. Following the Battle of Champion Hill, Sherman's corps also rejoined Grant's force. Grant's army then defeated a Confederate rear guard of about 5,000 troops at the Battle of Big Black River Bridge on May 17, 1863.

=== Start of the Vicksburg siege ===
The Confederates withdrew into the Vicksburg defenses on May 17, 1863. There, Pemberton ordered the garrisons at Haines Bluff, Walnut Hills and Warrenton to abandon their positions and move to the inner works at Vicksburg. On May 18, 1863, Pemberton received an instruction from Johnston to abandon the city and join his forces at Canton but Pemberton refused to do so, stating that he would hold the city. Jefferson Davis had declared that Vicksburg and Port Hudson should be held.

After costly Union frontal assaults at Vicksburg failed on May 19, 1863, and May 22, 1863, Union siege operations at Vicksburg began. Grant formally ordered the operations on May 25. Grant's Special Order Number 140, May 25, 1863, formally initiating siege operations, read: “Corps commanders will immediately commence the work of reducing the enemy by regular approaches. It is desirable that no more loss of life shall be sustained in the reduction of Vicksburg and the capture of the garrison.”

== End of Vicksburg siege ==
On June 22, 1863, Grant received an erroneous report that Johnston had crossed the Big Black River and was preparing to attack the Union forces. He also heard that some Union cavalry troopers were driven back by a Confederate raid at Birdsong's Ferry. Concerned with the possibility that Johnston would try to begin offensive operations from behind the Union positions, Grant ordered Sherman to expand a defensive line facing east from Snyder's Bluff overlooking the Yazoo River to the railroad bridge over the Big Black River west of Messinger's Ferry.

On June 25, 1863, Grant tried to bring the siege to a close by ordering mine explosions under the Confederate Third Louisiana Redan and a major Union attack on the Confederate positions after the explosion. The assault on the Confederate line failed to take the position. On July 1, another mine explosion was set off under the redan but it was not followed by an assault because the explosion was set off mainly to show the Confederates that their position was hopeless.

Despite receiving reinforcements bringing his total force to about 32,000 men by June 1, Johnston made no move to relieve Vicksburg until the end of June. He later would report to Jefferson Davis that he had received men but not the supplies, artillery, horses and wagons needed to move them. While Johnston delayed, Grant was being reinforced continuously through June.

Having not taken advantage of the small Confederate numerical superiority of Pemberton and his own combined forces in the first week of June, Johnston did not issue orders to move in force to the Big Black River until June 28. The Confederates did not approach the Union lines near Vicksburg until July 1. Instead of scouting approaches to the city when he finally arrived near the Union lines, Johnston examined reports about the roads, fords and Union positions between Jackson and Vicksburg. He found that the Union exterior line established by Sherman extended farther and was stronger than he anticipated. He decided these lines were too strong to attack along the east side of the Big Black River, which some historians assert he did not want to do in any event.

== Jackson expedition ==
Army Commanders:Jackson expedition
Siege of Jackson
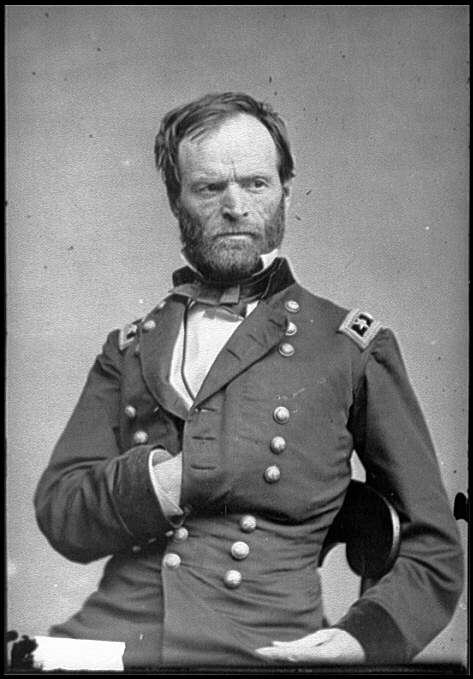
Major General
William T. Sherman Union Army

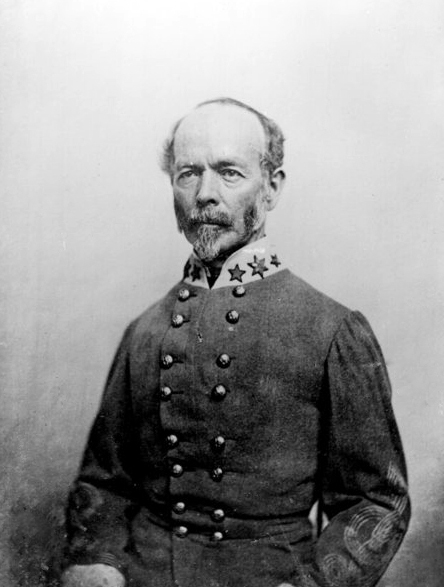
General
Joseph E. Johnston Confederate Army

=== Leaving Vicksburg ===
After learning of the surrender of Pemberton's army on July 4, 1863, on the same afternoon, Sherman ordered the units assigned for the expedition against Jackson to move to the Big Black River crossings. Sherman ordered the XV Corps to march to Messinger's Ferry, the XIII Corps to march to the Big Black River Bridge where a pontoon bridge also needed to be constructed and the IX Corps to move to Birdsong's Ferry. Sherman's force included the IX Corps under Major General John G. Parke, with one XVI Corps division under Brigadier General William Sooy Smith attached, that division included a cavalry brigade commanded by Colonel Cyrus Bussey; the XIII Corps under Major General Edward O. C. Ord, with a cavalry brigade commanded by Major Hugh Fullerton in the Ninth Division and with one XVI Corps division under Brigadier General Jacob G. Lauman and later under Brigadier General Alvin P. Hovey attached; the XV Corps, Sherman's own corps, under Major General Frederick Steele for this operation and a division of the XVII Corps under the command of Brigadier General John McArthur.

On July 5, Johnston learned of the surrender of Vicksburg and its defenders and began to move east toward Jackson. Johnston's "Army of Relief" consisted of Major General John C. Breckinridge's Division, Major General Samuel G. French's Division, Division Artillery, Major General William Wing Loring's's Division, Major General William Henry Talbot Walker's Division and Brigadier General William Hicks Jackson's Cavalry Division. Although Johnston began to move back to Jackson on July 5, he left detachments to guard some of the crossings of the Big Black River.

Several companies of William L. McMillen's brigade of Brigadier General James M. Tuttle's Third Division of Major General Frederick Steele's XV Corps crossed the river on July 5 in an effort to secure a bridgehead and were met by Confederate pickets. By late afternoon, Tuttle's men had secured the crest of a hill overlooking the river, pushed the Confederates away and established a camp more than three miles ahead on Bridgeport Road. The remainder of Steele's division crossed the bridge without encountering resistance.

Brigadier General William Sooy Smith's division of the IX Corp was the first to approach Birdsong's Ferry in the early morning of July 5. Confederate cavalry defenders under Brigadier General John Wilkins Whitfield were hidden in the underbrush across the river and brought the Union soldiers under small arms fire when they reached the river. The 40th Illinois Infantry Regiment and 103rd Illinois Infantry Regiment of Colonel Stephen G. Hicks's Second Brigade rushed to the river bank to oppose Whitfield's cavalry. Other regiments tried to cross the river on foot but were stopped by high water and strong currents. This resulted in Parke's IX Corps being prevented from crossing the river that night. On the morning of July 6, a Union patrol found and raised an old ferryboat which they repaired. By mid-afternoon, some of Smith's men were able to cross the river and force Whitfield's troopers to withdraw. It was mid-day on July 7 before the floating bridge necessary to allow Parke's men to cross was built; soon it partially collapsed. Park sent his artillery to cross at Messinger's Ferry and the men crossed the damaged bridge.

=== March to Jackson ===
Confederate cavalry persistently skirmished with the lead Union units throughout the march to Jackson. Skirmishes were fought on July 6 at Edwards Station, Jones Ford and Messigner's Ferry. On July 7, there was a skirmish at Queen Hill and encounters by cavalry of both armies at Baker's Creek on July 7 and Bolton's Depot on July 8.

While Sherman was making slow progress toward Jackson, after a hard, dry, dusty march during the hot Mississippi summer, Johnston's forces reached Jackson on the evening of July 7, 1863. A violent thunderstorm causing a torrential downpour helped alleviate conditions on the march for both armies, at least temporarily. Confederate Captain William H. Edwards later wrote that civilians took buckets off the water well ropes along the route and more than half the men “gave out, completely exhausted.” The defensive works at Jackson had been partially repaired after the Battle of Jackson on May 14 and the return of Johnston six days later. Johnston was not satisfied with the condition of the entrenchments. He ordered the trenches be strengthened and extended to anchor them on the Pearl River north and south of Jackson. Cotton bales and artillery positions protected the improved line.

On July 7, the XIII Corps and XV Corps of Sherman's pursuing forces were at Bolton, Mississippi, fewer than 20 miles from Jackson. Sherman had not heard from Parke and decided to rest at Bolton on July 8 to give the IX Corps time to catch up. A violent thunderstorm causing a torrential downpour helped alleviate conditions on the march, at least temporarily. At 4:00 p.m. on July 8, Sherman learned that the IX corps was on the way and ordered the XIII Corps and XV Corps to resume the march to Jackson. The IX Corps came up behind the XV Corps on the Bridgeport Road but found themselves behind the XV Corps because a presumed alternate road further north did not exist. The XI Corps caught up by moving cross country over rolling hills.

On July 8, Union cavalry and several infantry units fought a large skirmish near Clinton. Major Fullerton was forced to deploy his troopers as skirmishers and use mountain howitzers to clear the way on the Jackson Road. Bussey's cavalry and several companies of infantry also had to fight Whitfield's men on the Bridgeport Road three miles west of town. Whitfield withdrew at dark unopposed.

=== Approach to Jackson ===
Units of Sherman's army reached Clinton on July 9 and a detachment of the 6th Missouri Cavalry Regiment skirmished with Confederates near Clinton. One last skirmish near Jackson was fought on July 9 between troops of William Sooy Smith's division and troops manning Confederate outposts. Smith's men were well out ahead of the rest of Parke's IX Corps. Smith had the men bivouac for the night in line of battle because he was concerned they might become isolated.

Johnston had not stockpiled supplies or repaired the railroad bridge east of Jackson after the earlier battle. This meant that the Confederates would risk being trapped without sufficient supplies if they held out against an attacking force for any great length of time and could not remove stranded locomotives and railroad cars.

Although Sherman limited marching to the morning and late afternoon and early evening, his men suffered from heat, dust and shortage of water on the march to Jackson, where they arrived on July 10, 1863. The Confederates had poisoned wells and streams with dead animals as they progressed to Jackson, which forced the Union troops to haul drinking water from the Big Black River. Historian Jim Woodrick noted that numerous accounts by soldiers of both sides complained about the extreme heat and parched conditions. Sherman moved his headquarters to Clinton on the evening of July 9 and began to plan for the approach to the city.

== Siege of Jackson ==
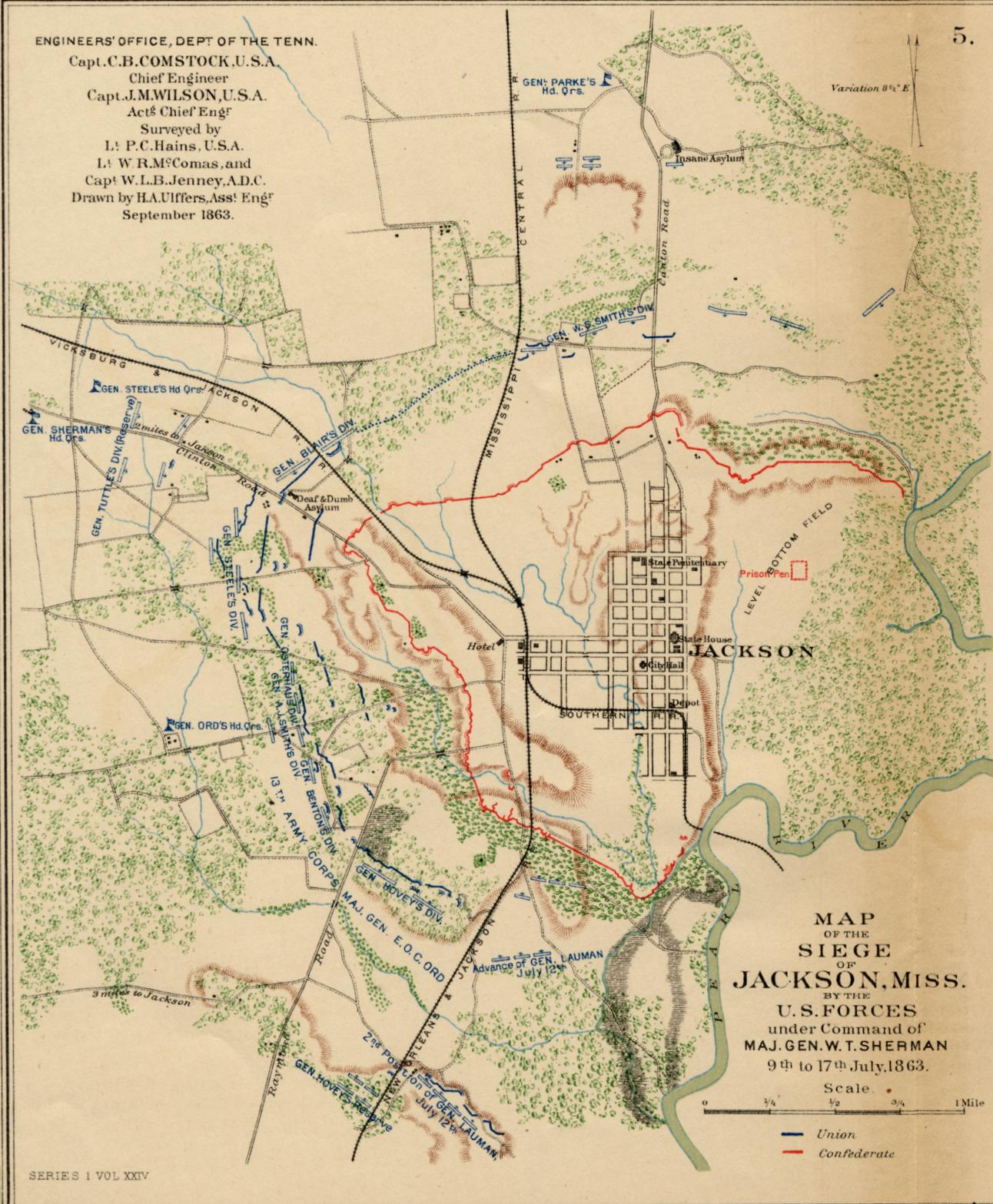
Siege of Jackson

=== Deployment ===
After personally scouting the Confederate defenses, upon his arrival at Jackson on July 10, 1863, Sherman ordered his corps commanders to spread out around them at about 1,500 yards from Confederate parapets, with skirmishers closer up and supports for them within 500 yards. Johnston had hoped to draw Sherman's forces into a costly frontal attack but after Sherman had seen the improved Confederate fortifications at Jackson and encountered resistance in approaching the Confederate lines, he ordered setting up artillery positions and earthworks to besiege the city.

Major General Francis P. Blair's division led the XV Corps toward Jackson on the morning of July 10. As the Union division closed in on the silent Confederate fortifications at about 9:30 a.m., a Confederate 32-pounder gun, then other artillery, opened fire on them. Sherman quickly went forward when he heard the artillery and began to deploy Steele's XV Corps to both sides of the Jackson Road.

To the south, the XIII Corps divisions of Peter J. Osterhaus and Andrew J. Smith moved toward the city along a connecting lane from the northeast and turned into Robinson Road, thinking it was the Raymond Road, which was a mile farther down the lane. Initial Confederate resistance from a small Confederate outpost on Lynch Creek and some men of French's division was driven off by Fullerton's cavalry and infantry support from Osterhaus's division. The two Union divisions occupied a ridge east of Lynch Creek within 250 yards of the Confederate line.

Fullerton's cavalry scouted to the right and found that the Raymond Road was a mile away and that there were Confederate troops at that location. The Union soldiers already at the front dug rifle pits during the afternoon while artillery of each side fired on the other. Union soldiers captured a cistern during the fight which gave them a crucial source of water. When the XIII Corps divisions of William Benton, Alvin P. Hovey and Jacob Lauman and moved forward, A. J. Smith still was concerned about Confederate defenders further to the right of his position and he asked the newly-arrived divisions to move to that end of the Union line in that order from north to south. Hovey's and Lauman's divisions were placed last along the Terry Road and on Bailey Hill overlooking Lynch Creek east of the line of the New Orleans, Jackson and Great Northern Railroad entering the city from the south. Lauman's division was at the end of the line and farther back from the Confederate line than the other Union divisions.

To the northwest of the city, the earlier arriving division of William Sooy Smith waited for other IX Corps divisions to catch up. By mid-afternoon the IX Corps began to move to the east with W. S. Smith's force east of the New Orleans, Jackson and Great Northern Railroad line heading north from Jackson. The divisions went into position after reaching the Canton Road, with Confederate cavalry harassing them as they moved forward. Brigadier generals Thomas Welsh and Robert B. Potter placed their divisions west of the railroad with Welsh's troops on the Insane Asylum ridge.

When the full Union deployment was completed, Union divisions occupied positions opposite Confederate divisions in a semi-circular defensive line west of the town between branches of the Pearl River opposite Confederate divisions. Sherman deployed the XIII Corps under Ord on the Union right which was on the south end of the line on both sides of the Raymond Road. Loring's Division was on the Confederate left opposite the XIII Corps position. Sherman deployed his own XV Corps under Steele to the middle of the Union line. Walker's Division and French's Division were opposite Steele's corps in the middle of the Confederate defensive works. Sherman deployed the IX Corps under Parke on the Union left to the north. Breckinridge's Division was on the Confederate right, across the New Orleans, Jackson and Great Northern Railroad, opposite Parke's IX Corps.

Since Sherman did not want to make a frontal assault against strong resistance, on the night of July 10, he issued orders to the corps commanders to construct artillery positions and rifle pits as close as possible to the Confederate lines without taking needless casualties. By the end of the day on July 11, Sherman was satisfied about the construction of the protective earthworks and artillery positions and he ordered a general bombardment of Confederate positions.

Sherman's forces brought only a small number of artillery rounds per gun on the march to Jackson. After starting the siege, he requested that the reserve ordnance train with additional artillery rounds be sent to his units as quickly as possible. Johnston learned that this artillery train was coming and on July 14 he sent cavalry under the command of William H. Jackson to intercept it. The Confederate cavalry failed to stop the delivery to Sherman's forces because Sherman received intelligence that the cavalry had been dispatched and acted to protect the wagon train. Sherman ordered a brigade stationed at Champion Hill to escort the train and another brigade to move to Clinton to protect it. When Johnston heard about the failed interdiction, he was even more convinced that he could not hold out under a siege and ordered his commanders to prepare to leave the city at once.

=== Union assault ===
Needing to conserve ammunition, on July 12 the Union artillery launched a heavy bombardment of the Confederate defenses but ceased firing in less than an hour. After the bombardment, Major General Ord told Brigadier General Hovey to move forward and entrench close to the Confederate fortifications. Hovey told Brigadier General Lauman at his right at the end of the Union line about the movement. Along with an instruction from Major General Ord the night before to make a reconnaissance on the Confederate line and if necessary attack the force in front while staying in connection with Hovey, Lauman mistook the information from Hovey as an order for an assault on the Confederate lines.

While Hovey stopped his division's advance about 500 yards short of the Confederate line, Lauman had ordered his men to advance and attack. Colonel Isaac Pugh's brigade was leading the advance. Pugh was reluctant to cross a field in front of the Confederate positions manned by the Washington Artillery and Brigadier General Daniel Weisiger Adams's brigade. After Lauman came to examine the front at Pugh's request, however, he ordered Pugh to continue even though Hovey's force had stopped to dig in. Eighty yards from the Confederate line, Pugh's men were stopped by an abatis and Confederate fire. Survivors who could not escape began to surrender in face of the murderous Confederate artillery and small arms fire.

Before the Union assault, Confederate soldiers had burned the Cooper House to give a clear field of fire in front of their fortifications. At the family's request, the soldiers saved some items, including a piano. They took the piano into the trenches and some members of the Washington Artillery battery played the piano and sang familiar songs before, during and after Colonel Pugh's attack. Sherman's troops took the piano after the Confederates left the city. In 2023, the piano still can be seen at the Confederate Memorial Hall in New Orleans.

In the assault, the Union forces lost 68 killed, 302 wounded and more than 200 prisoners according to historian Michael Ballard while William Shea & Terrence Winshel as well as historian Jim Woodrick state that the Union force suffered 465 total casualties. Colonel Seth C. Earl commander of the 53rd Illinois Infantry Regiment was killed and Colonel Aaron Brown of the 3rd Iowa Infantry Regiment was wounded in the assault. The Confederates had seven casualties, only two killed and five wounded. Lieutenant Colonel Henry Maury in command of the 32nd Alabama Infantry Regiment was among the Confederate casualties, having been wounded by a sharpshooter. When Ord went to Lauman's headquarters after being informed of the attack, he found Lauman disoriented and unable to put his division in order. Ord relieved Lauman of command, placing his division under Hovey's command.

=== End of the siege ===
After the July 12 Union assault, the armies continued to exchange artillery fire. Picket firing and small engagements by companies also continued. The largest such engagement was a reconnaissance in force by six Union regiments on July 15 which established that the Confederates were still in position opposite Parke's corps and resulted in Union casualties of two killed and five wounded. Sharpshooters also were active throughout the remainder of the siege.

The Confederate cavalry effort to find and attack the Union ammunition wagon train was thwarted by the two infantry brigades that Sherman had sent to protect the wagons. Sherman ordered Colonel Alexander Chambers brigade at Champion Hill to escort the wagon train after having received intelligence that Johnston was planning to send cavalry to intercept it. Sherman also ordered Brigadier General Charles Matthies to reinforce the garrison at Clinton to stop the Confederate cavalry's progress. Only a small part of the Confederate force was able to advance to spot the wagon train. They decided not to attack the wagons because of the strong Union escort of the wagon train. Upon receipt of part of the supply of the ammunition on July 14, the Union shelling picked up. When Johnston was told that the cavalry mission had failed on July 16, he ordered the evacuation of the city that night. After the Confederates crossed the Pearl River bridge, they burned it to hinder Union pursuit. The Union forces discovered the Confederate retreat only the next morning. Johnston did not halt the retreat until his forces reached Morton, Mississippi, forty miles east of Jackson.

Sherman's forces made a weak attempt to pursue the Confederates but intolerable heat and a lack of cavalry to keep in contact with and to harass the Confederate forces ultimately caused Sherman to give up the pursuit. An expeditionary force from Steele's XV Corps commanded by Colonel Milo Smith and Colonel James L. Geddes did march toward Brandon, Mississippi on July 18. They found many of Lauman's wounded men from the July 12 attack at a Confederate hospital. On July 19, the Union force engaged with a Confederate cavalry rear guard under Brigadier General George Cosby, immediately losing a man killed. After an exchange of artillery fire, Geddes's men moved toward the Confederate position through a large cornfield. As the Union soldiers got within small arms range, a torrential downpour ended the encounter. The Confederates moved out of Brandon and the Union force moved in for the night. The Union soldiers burned a quarter of the town and engaged in extensive pillaging. After tearing up the railroad and burning the depot on July 20, the Union force gave up the pursuit and returned to Jackson.

Determined to leave nothing of value for the Confederates after they withdrew from Jackson, Sherman's men destroyed commercial buildings, factories, warehouses and remaining railroad facilities around Jackson. Johnston's failure to repair the Pearl River railroad bridge left many railroad cars that could have been moved to the east through Jackson isolated at Grenada, Mississippi and subject to destruction by Union cavalry. On July 17, Colonel Cyrus Bussey's cavalry, reinforced by Colonel Charles R. Woods's artillery battery, entered Canton, Mississippi and wrecked railroad yards, five locomotives, thirty rail cars, two turntables, a large lumber yard and the Dixie Works, which produced various types of conveyances for the Confederate government.

By July 23, the comprehensive destruction caused by the Union troops led to Jackson's nickname as "Chimneyville." A newspaper correspondent for the Memphis Appeal had been in Jackson during the siege and later reported that some fires had been started by Johnston's men before they left in order to destroy supplies. After an appeal by the mayor of Jackson before the Union forces departed for Vicksburg on July 23, Sherman left 200 barrels of flour and 100 barrels of salt pork for the few hundred civilians remaining at Jackson. By July 25, Sherman's men had returned to Vicksburg where they were able to rest for the remainder of the summer.

Confederate casualties during the siege were 71 killed, 504 wounded and 25 missing. Union casualties were 129 killed, 762 wounded and 231 missing. The re-capture of Jackson by the Union Army effectively ended the last potential Confederate threat to re-take Vicksburg. Historian Michael Ballard wrote that Johnston's retreat was the last major action by a large Confederate force in Mississippi and that most of his "Army of Relief" would be combined with the Army of Tennessee.

With the capture of Port Hudson, Louisiana at the conclusion of the Siege of Port Hudson on July 9, 1863, the Union Army and Union Navy gained complete control of the Mississippi River.

== Sources ==
- Arnold, James R. Grant Wins the War: Decision at Vicksburg. New York: John Wiley & Sons, Inc., 1997. ISBN 978-0-471-15727-4.
- Ballard, Michael B. The Civil War in Mississippi: Major Campaigns and Battles. Jackson, MS: University of Mississippi Press, 2011. ISBN 978-1-62846-170-1.
- Ballard, Michael B. Vicksburg, The Campaign that Opened the Mississippi. Chapel Hill: University of North Carolina Press, 2004. ISBN 978-0-8078-2893-9.
- Bearss, Edwin C. Fields of Honor: Pivotal Battles of the Civil War. Washington, DC: National Geographic Society, 2006. ISBN 978-0-7922-7568-8.
- Bearss, Edwin C. with J. Parker Hills. Receding Tide: Vicksburg and Gettysburg, The Campaigns That Changed the Civil War. Washington, DC: National Geographic, 2010. ISBN 978-1-4262-0510-1.
- Carter III, Samuel. The Final Fortress: The Campaign for Vicksburg 1862–1863. New York, St. Martin's Press, 1980. ISBN 978-0-312-83926-0.
- Dyer, Frederick H. A Compendium of the War of the Rebellion Des Moines, IA: The Dyer Publishing Company, 1908. (This source is in the public domain; the copyright expired many years ago.)
- Eicher, John H., and David J. Eicher, Civil War High Commands. Stanford: Stanford University Press, 2001. ISBN 978-0-8047-3641-1.
- Greene, Francis Vinton. The Mississippi. Campaigns of the Civil War - VIII. New York: Charles Scribner's Sons, 1882. Reprinted by Digital Scanning Inc. (August 16, 2004) ISBN 978-1-58218-534-7. (This source is in the public domain; the copyright expired many years ago.)
- Huston, James A. The Sinews of War: Army Logistics, 1775-1953 Washington, D.C. Center of Military History, United States Army, 1997. First printed 1966. Print Book, 1988. OCLC 18364431 p. 170. (Public domain.)
- Korn, Jerry, and the Editors of Time-Life Books. War on the Mississippi: Grant's Vicksburg Campaign. Alexandria, VA: Time-Life Books, 1985. ISBN 0-8094-4744-4.
- McGowen, Stanley S. Vicksburg Campaign (May–July 1863) In Encyclopedia of the American Civil War: A Political, Social, and Military History, edited by David S. Heidler and Jeanne T. Heidler. New York: W. W. Norton & Company, 2000. ISBN 978-0-393-04758-5. pp. 2021-2027.
- Miller, Donald L. Vicksburg: Grant's Campaign That Broke the Confederacy. New York: Simon & Schuster Paperbacks, 2020. ISBN 978-1-4516-4139-4. First published in hardcover 2019.
- Shea, William L. and Terrence J. Winschel. Vicksburg is the Key: The Struggle for the Mississippi River. Lincoln, NE: University of Nebraska Press, 2003. ISBN 978-0-8032-9344-1.
- Symonds, Craig L. Joseph E. Johnston: A Civil War Biography. New York: W. W. Norton, 1992. ISBN 978-0-393-31130-3.
- Woodrick, Jim. The Civil War Siege of Jackson, Mississippi. Charleston, SC: The History Press, 2016. ISBN 978-1-62619-729-9.
