= Daniel Weisiger Adams =

American lawyer

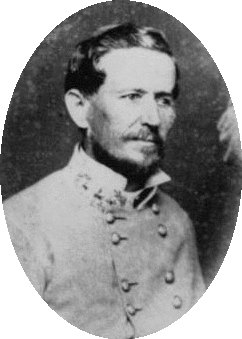
- D. W. Adams as a Confederate General
- Born: May 1, 1821; Frankfort, Kentucky, US
- Died: June 13, 1872 (aged 51); New Orleans, Louisiana, US
- Burial place: Greenwood Cemetery, Mississippi, US
- Relatives: Brother of William Wirt Adams
- Military career
- Allegiance: Confederate States of America
- Branch: Confederate States Army
- Service years: 1861–1865
- Rank: Brigadier General
- Commands: 1st Louisiana Regulars
- Conflicts: American Civil War -Battle of Shiloh -Battle of Perryville -Battle of Stones River -Battle of Chickamauga -Battle of Selma

Daniel Weisiger Adams (May 1, 1821 – June 13, 1872) was a lawyer and a brigadier general in the Confederate States Army during the American Civil War.

== Early life and career ==
Adams was born in Frankfort, Kentucky, to George Adams and Anna Weisiger Adams. His brother, William Wirt Adams, was also a Confederate Army brigadier general.

The family moved to Mississippi in 1825. Adams read law and became a lawyer in Mississippi.

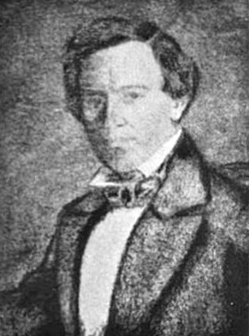
Pre-Civil War portrait of Daniel Adams

He also was a second lieutenant in the Mississippi Militia and a member of the Mississippi legislature, serving in the Mississippi State Senate from 1852 to 1856.

Adams killed James Hagan in a duel on June 6, 1843. Hagan, editor of the Vicksburg Sentinel, had criticized Adams' father.

Adams moved to New Orleans, Louisiana in 1852. He became prominent in local political and social circles, and his practice became one of the city's largest.

== Civil War ==
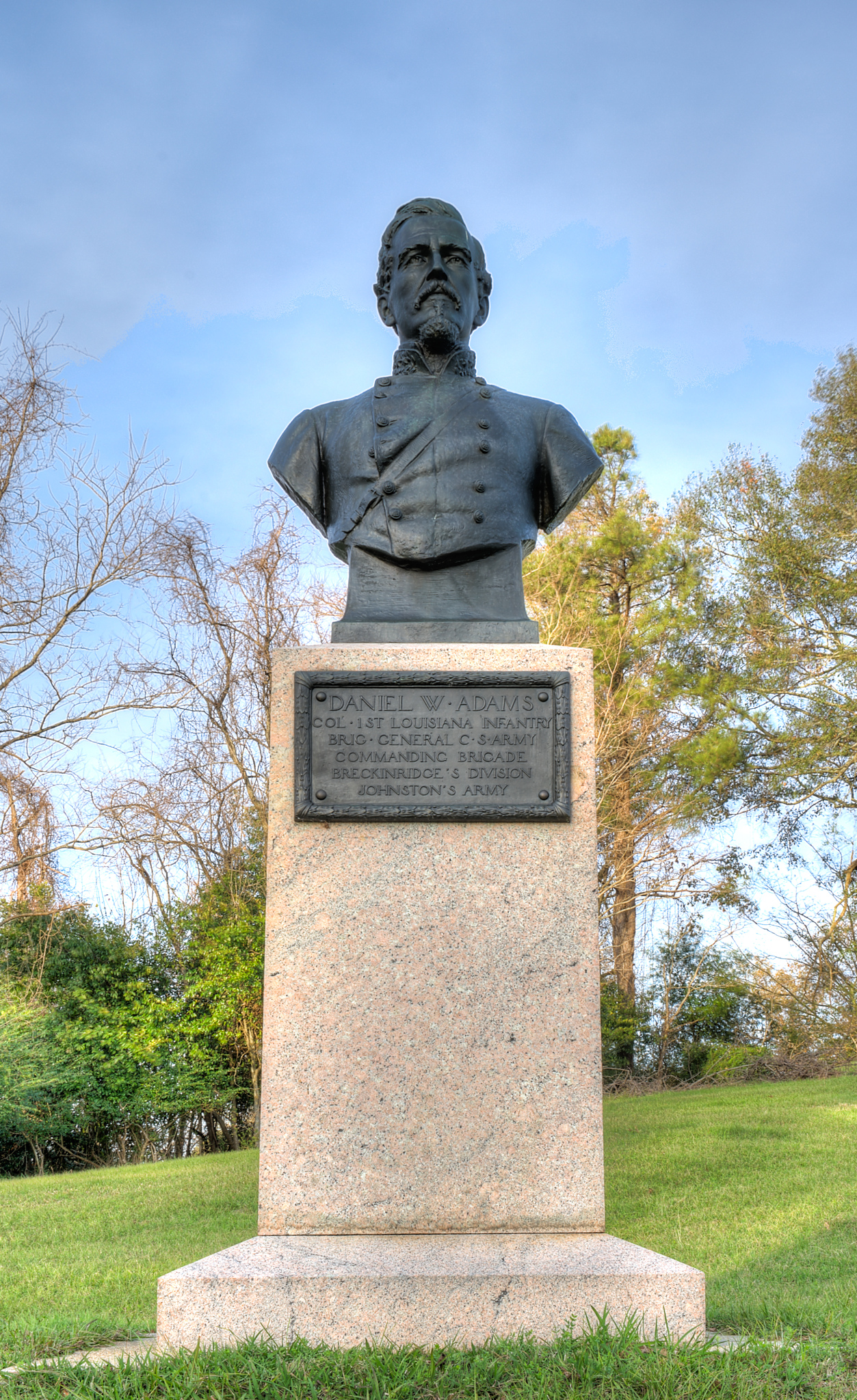
Bust of Adams at Vicksburg National Military Park

With the secession of Louisiana following the 1860 election of Abraham Lincoln as President of the United States, in early 1861 Louisiana Governor Thomas O. Moore appointed Adams a member of the military board created to prepare the state for war. Adams was later appointed a lieutenant colonel of the 1st Louisiana Regulars, or 1st Louisiana Infantry, in the Confederate Army, and was promoted to the rank of colonel on October 30, 1861, after the regiment was sent to Pensacola, Florida.

When his regiment's brigade commander, Brigadier General Adley H. Gladden was killed on the first day of the Battle of Shiloh, Adams assumed command of the brigade. Soon thereafter, Adams was wounded in further fighting at the Hornet's Nest. A bullet hit Adams just above his left eye and exited behind the left ear, severing the optic nerve and leaving him blinded in the left eye. Adams was put in an ambulance wagon, but had become unresponsive, so the driver assumed he was dead and threw him overboard to lighten the load. Adams was saved when passing soldiers of the 10th Mississippi Infantry Regiment found him and realized that he was still alive. After a month of recuperating in an army hospital in Corinth, he was able to resume his duties.

Adams was promoted to brigadier general on May 23. 1862. He led his brigade at the battles of Perryville and Stones River. He was wounded again, in the left arm, at Stones River on December 31, 1862.

Adams returned to duty in early 1863 and led his brigade at the siege of Jackson, Mississippi under General Joseph E. Johnston. Under the command of General Braxton Bragg, Adams's brigade fought at the Chickamauga. Adams's brigade broke through the Union lines on the second day of the battle but they were driven back by Union Army reinforcements. Adams was again wounded, in the left arm, and captured.

When he recovered sufficiently to return to duty and was exchanged, Adams briefly commanded a cavalry brigade. He subsequently was made the commander of the District of Central Alabama in 1864, and the commander of the State of Alabama, North of Gulf Department in 1865. Although he sought a promotion to major general, he remained a brigadier general until the end of the war. He took part in the Battle of Selma in 1865, and the Battle of Columbus, Georgia, that same year. Adams surrendered to Union forces in Meridian, Mississippi on May 9 and took the oath of allegiance to the United States.

== Postbellum career ==
After the war ended, Adams spent some time in England, then returned to New Orleans to practice law along with Harry T. Hays, a fellow Confederate general. Adams lived for a time in New York City where he was involved in the real estate business before moving back to New Orleans to resume his law practice and engage in state politics. He died in his office of a massive stroke on June 13, 1872. Daniel Weisiger Adams is buried at Greenwood Cemetery in Jackson, Mississippi next to his brother William Wirt Adams. Daniel Weisiger Adams's gravesite is unmarked. He was a member of The Boston Club of New Orleans.

== See also ==
- List of American Civil War generals (Confederate)
- William Wirt Adams
- Reed N. Weisiger
