= Battle of Nashville order of battle: Confederate =

The following Confederate States Army units and commanders fought in the Battle of Nashville of the American Civil War. The order of battle has been compiled from the army organization during the campaign and reports. The Union order of battle is shown separately.

== Abbreviations used ==
=== Military rank ===
- Gen = General
- LTG = Lieutenant General
- MG = Major General
- BG = Brigadier General
- Col = Colonel
- Ltc = Lieutenant Colonel
- Maj = Major
- Cpt = Captain
- Lt = Lieutenant
- Sgt = Sergeant

=== Other ===
- w = wounded
- mw = mortally wounded
- k = killed
- c = captured

== Army of Tennessee ==
Gen John B. Hood, Commanding

=== Cheatham’s Corps ===
MG Benjamin F. Cheatham

Chief of Artillery: Col Melancthon Smith

Division	Brigade	Regiments and Others
Brown's Division; BG Mark P. Lowrey	Gist's Brigade Ltc Zachariah L. Watters	46th Georgia: Cpt Malcolm Gillis; 65th Georgia-8th Georgia Battalion: Cpt William W. Grant; 2nd Georgia Sharpshooters Battalion: Cpt William H. Brown; 16th South Carolina: Cpt John W. Boling; 24th South Carolina: Cpt William C. Griffith
Brown's Division; BG Mark P. Lowrey	Strahl's Brigade Col Andrew J. Kellar	4th-5th-31st-33rd-38th Tennessee: Ltc Luke W. Finlay; 19th-24th-41st Tennessee: Cpt Daniel A. Kennedy
Brown's Division; BG Mark P. Lowrey	Maney's Brigade Col Hume R. Field	4th (Provision Army)-6th-9th-50th Tennessee: Ltc George W. Pease; 1st-27th Tennessee: Ltc John L. House; 8th-16th-28th Tennessee: Col John H. Anderson
Brown's Division; BG Mark P. Lowrey	Vaughan's Brigade Col William M. Watkins	11th-29th Tennessee: Maj John E. Binns; 12th-47th Tennessee: Cpt Charles N. Wade; 13th-51st-52nd-154th (Senior) Tennessee: Col. Michael Magevney, Jr. (c), Maj John T. Williamson
Brown's Division; BG Mark P. Lowrey	Artillery Battalion	Perry's (Florida) battery; Phelan's (Alabama) battery; Turner's (Mississippi) battery
Cleburne's Division; BG James A. Smith	Smith's Brigade (attached to Forrest's command at Murfreesboro) Col Charles H. Olmstead	1st Georgia Volunteers: Maj Martin J. Ford; 54th Georgia: Cpt George W. Moody; 57th Georgia: Cpt Lucius C. Bryan; 63rd Georgia: Cpt Elijah J. Craven
Cleburne's Division; BG James A. Smith	Govan's Brigade BG Daniel C. Govan (w); Col Peter V. Green (w)	1st-2nd-5th-13th-15th-24th Arkansas: Col Peter V. Green; 6th-7th Arkansas: Ltc Peter Snyder; 8th-19th Arkansas: Maj David H. Hamiter
Cleburne's Division; BG James A. Smith	Lowrey's Brigade Ltc Robert H. Abercrombie	16th-33rd-45th Alabama: Ltc Robert H. Abercrombie; 5th Regiment-3rd Mississippi Battalion: Cpt Francis M. Woodward; 8th-32nd Mississippi: Maj Andrew E. Moody
Cleburne's Division; BG James A. Smith	Granbury's Brigade Cpt Edward T. Broughton	5th Confederate: Lt William E. Smith; 35th Tennessee: Col Benjamin J. Hill; 6th-15th Texas: Cpt Benjamin R. Tyus; 7th Texas: Cpt Orren P. Forrest; 10th Texas: Cpt Reuben D. Kennedy; 17th-18th Texas Cavalry (dismounted): Cpt Felix L. McKnight; 24th-25th Texas Cavalry (dismounted): Cpt John F. Matthews; Nutt's (Louisiana) Cavalry Company (dismounted): Cpt Leroy M. Nutt
Bate's Division; MG William B. Bate	Tyler's Brigade BG Thomas B. Smith (w&c)	37th Georgia: Cpt James A. Sanders; 4th Georgia Sharpshooters Battalion: Maj Theodore D. Caswell; 2nd-10th-20th-37th Tennessee: Ltc William M. Shy (k), Maj Henry C. Lucas
Bate's Division; MG William B. Bate	Finley's Brigade Maj Jacob A. Lash (mw&c); Maj Glover A. Ball	1st-3rd Florida: Cpt Matthew H. Strain; 6th Florida: Cpt Angus McMillan; 7th Florida: Cpt Robert B. Smith; 1st Florida Cavalry-4th Florida Infantry: Cpt George R. Langford
Bate's Division; MG William B. Bate	Jackson's Brigade BG Henry R. Jackson (c)	1st Confederate (Georgia)-66th Georgia: Ltc James C. Gordon; 25th Georgia: Cpt Joseph E. Fulton; 29th-30th Georgia: Col William D. Mitchell; 1st Georgia Sharpshooters Battalion: Lt R. Cuyler King
Bate's Division; MG William B. Bate	Cobb's Artillery Battalion Cpt Rene T. Beauregard	Slocomb's (Louisiana) Battery; Ferguson's (South Carolina) Battery; Mebane's (Tennessee) Battery
Corps artillery	Hotchkiss's Battalion	Bledsoe's (Missouri) battery; Goldthwaite's (Alabama) battery; Key's (Arkansas) battery

=== Lee’s Corps ===
LTG Stephen D. Lee

Chief of Artillery
Maj John W. Johnston

Division	Brigade	Regiments and Others
Johnson's Division; MG Edward Johnson (c)	Deas' Brigade BG Zachariah C. Deas	19th Alabama: Ltc George R. Kimbrough; 22nd Alabama: Cpt Hugh W. Henry; 25th Alabama: Cpt Napoleon B. Rouse; 39th Alabama: Ltc William C. Clifton; 50th Alabama: Col John G. Coltart
Johnson's Division; MG Edward Johnson (c)	Sharp's Brigade BG Jacob H. Sharp	7th-9th Mississippi: Maj Henry Pope; 10th-44th-9th Sharpshooters Battalion Mississippi: Cpt Robert A. Bell; 41st Mississippi: Cpt James M. Hicks
Johnson's Division; MG Edward Johnson (c)	Manigault's Brigade Ltc William L. Butler	24th Alabama: Cpt Thomas J. Kimbell; 28th Alabama: Cpt William M. Nabors; 34th Alabama: Ltc John C. Carter; 10th South Carolina: Ltc C. Irvine Walker; 19th South Carolina: Cpt Thomas W. Getzen
Johnson's Division; MG Edward Johnson (c)	Brantley's Brigade BG William F. Brantley	24th-34th Mississippi: Cpt Clifton Dancy; 27th Mississippi: Cpt Samuel M. Pegg; 29th-30th Mississippi: Cpt Robert W. Williamson; Alexander's (Tennessee) Cavalry Company (dismounted): Cpt David W. Alexander
Johnson's Division; MG Edward Johnson (c)	Courtney's Artillery Battalion Cpt James P. Douglas	Dent's (Alabama) Battery: Cpt Staunton H. Dent; Douglas's Texas Battery: Lt Benjamin Hardin; Garrity's (Alabama) Battery: Lt Henry F. Carrell
Stevenson's Division; MG Carter L. Stevenson	Cumming's Brigade Col Elihu P. Watkins	34th Georgia: Cpt Russell A. Jones; 36th Georgia: Col Charles E. Broyles; 39th Georgia: Cpt William P. Milton; 56th Georgia: Cpt Benjamin T. Spearman
Stevenson's Division; MG Carter L. Stevenson	Pettus's Brigade BG Edmund W. Pettus	20th Alabama: Col James M. Dedman; 23rd Alabama: Ltc Joseph B. Bibb; 30th Alabama: Ltc James K. Elliott; 31st Alabama: Ltc Thomas M. Arrington; 46th Alabama: Cpt George E. Brewer
Stevenson's Division; MG Carter L. Stevenson	Brown's and Reynolds' Brigade Col Joseph B. Palmer	60th North Carolina: Maj James T. Huff; 3rd-18th Tennessee: Ltc William R. Butler; 23rd-26th-45th Tennessee: Col Anderson Searcy; 32nd Tennessee: Col John P. McGuire; 54th Virginia Infantry: Cpt William G. Anderson; 63rd Virginia Infantry: Ltc Connally H. Lynch
Clayton's Division; MG Henry D. Clayton	Stovall's Brigade BG Marcellus A. Stovall	40th Georgia: Col Abda Johnson; 41st Georgia: Cpt Jared E. Stallings; 42nd Georgia: Col Robert J. Henderson; 43rd Georgia: Col Henry C. Kellogg; 52nd Georgia: Cpt Rufus R. Asbury
Clayton's Division; MG Henry D. Clayton	Holtzclaw's Brigade BG James T. Holtzclaw (w)	18th Alabama: Ltc Peter F. Hunley; 32nd-58th Alabama: Col Bushrod Jones; 36th Alabama: Cpt Nathan M. Carpenter; 38th Alabama: Cpt Charles E. Bussey
Clayton's Division; MG Henry D. Clayton	Gibson's Brigade BG Randall L. Gibson	1st Louisiana Regulars: Cpt James C. Stafford; 4th Louisiana: Col Samuel E. Hunter; 13th-20th Louisiana: Col Francis L. Campbell; 16th-25th Louisiana: Col Francis C. Zacharie; 19th Louisiana: Maj Camp Flournoy; 30th Louisiana: Maj Arthur Picolet; 4th Louisiana Battalion: Cpt T. Alexander Bisland; 14th Louisiana Battalion Sharpshooters: Lt Andrew T. Martin
Clayton's Division; MG Henry D. Clayton	Eldridge's Artillery Battalion Cpt Charles E. Fenner	Eufaula (Alabama) Battery: Cpt William J. McKenzie; Fenner's (Louisiana) Battery: Lt Wat T. Cluverius; Stanford's (Mississippi) Battery: Lt James S. McCall
Corps Artillery	Johnston's Battalion Cpt John B. Rowan (k)	Corput's (Georgia) Battery: Lt William S. Hoge; Marshall's (Tennessee) Battery: Cpt Lucius G. Marshall; Stephens (Georgia) Light Artillery: Lt William L. Ritter

=== Stewart’s Corps ===
LTG Alexander P. Stewart

Chief of Artillery
Ltc Samuel C. Williams

Division	Brigade	Regiments and Others
Loring's Division; MG William W. Loring	Featherston's Brigade BG Winfield S. Featherston	1st Mississippi: Cpt Owen D. Hughes; 3rd Mississippi: Cpt O. H. Johnston; 22nd Mississippi: Maj Martin A. Oatis; 31st Mississippi: Cpt Robert A. Collins; 33rd Mississippi: Cpt Thomas L. Cooper; 40th Mississippi: Col Wallace B. Colbert; 1st Mississippi Battalion: Maj James M. Stigler
Loring's Division; MG William W. Loring	Adams' Brigade Col Robert Lowry	6th Mississippi: Ltc Thomas J. Borden; 14th Mississippi: Col Washington L. Doss; 15th Mississippi: Ltc James R. Binford; 20th Mississippi: Maj Thomas B. Graham; 23rd Mississippi: Maj George W. B. Garrett; 43rd Mississippi: Col Richard Harrison
Loring's Division; MG William W. Loring	Scott's Brigade Col John Snodgrass	55th Alabama: Maj James B. Dickey; 57th Alabama: Maj J. Horatio Wiley; 27th-35th-49th Alabama: Ltc John D. Weeden; 12th Louisiana: Cpt James T. Davis
Loring's Division; MG William W. Loring	Myrick's Artillery Battalion	Bouanchaud's (Louisiana) battery; Cowan's (Mississippi) battery; Darden's (Mississippi) battery
French's Division; MG Samuel G. French (absent, sick) temporarily attached to Walthall's Division	Sears' Brigade BG Claudius W. Sears (w)	4th Mississippi; 35th Mississippi; 36th Mississippi; 39th Mississippi; 46th Mississippi; 7th Mississippi Battalion
French's Division; MG Samuel G. French (absent, sick) temporarily attached to Walthall's Division	Ector's Brigade Col David Coleman	29th North Carolina: Maj Ezekiel H. Hampton; 39th North Carolina: Cpt James G. Crawford; 9th Texas: Maj James H. McReynolds; 10th Texas Cavalry (dismounted): Col Cullin R. Earp; 14th Texas Cavalry (dismounted): Cpt Robert H. Harkey; 32nd Texas Cavalry (dismounted): Maj William E. Estes
French's Division; MG Samuel G. French (absent, sick) temporarily attached to Walthall's Division	Cockrell's Brigade (on detached duty on the Duck River) Col Peter C. Flournoy	1st-4th Missouri: Cpt James H. Wickersham; 2nd-6th Missouri: Ltc Stephen Cooper; 3rd-5th Missouri: Cpt Benjamin E. Guthrie; 1st-3rd Missouri Cavalry (dismounted): Lt Charles B. Cleveland
French's Division; MG Samuel G. French (absent, sick) temporarily attached to Walthall's Division	Storrs' Artillery Battalion	Guibor's (Missouri) battery; Hoskins' (Mississippi) battery; Kolb's (Alabama) battery
Walthall's Division; MG Edward C. Walthall	Quarles' Brigade BG George D. Johnston	1st Alabama: Lt Charles M. McRae; 42nd-46th-49th-53rd-55th Tennessee: Cpt Austin M. Duncan; 48th Tennessee: Col William M. Voorhies
Walthall's Division; MG Edward C. Walthall	Cantey's Brigade BG Charles M. Shelley	17th Alabama: Cpt John Bolling, Jr.; 26th Alabama: Cpt Daniel M. Gideon; 29th Alabama: Cpt Samuel Abernethy; 37th Mississippi: Maj Samuel H. Terral
Walthall's Division; MG Edward C. Walthall	Reynolds' Brigade BG Daniel H. Reynolds	1st Arkansas Mounted Rifles (dismounted): Cpt Ronert P. Parks; 2nd Arkansas Mounted Rifles (dismounted): Maj James P. Eagle; 4th Arkansas: Maj Jesse A. Ross; 9th Arkansas: Cpt William L. Phifer; 25th Arkansas: Lt Thomas J. Edwards
Walthall's Division; MG Edward C. Walthall	Trueheart's Artillery Battalion Cpt James H. Yates	Lumsden's (Alabama) battery; Selden's (Alabama) battery; Tarrant's (Alabama) battery

=== Cavalry Corps ===
MG Nathan B. Forrest
(Detached; at Murfreesboro with Jackson's and Buford's Divisions.)

Division	Brigade	Regiments and Others
Chalmers' Division; BG James R. Chalmers	Rucker's Brigade Col Edmund W. Rucker (w&c); Ltc Raleigh R. White	7th Alabama Cavalry; 5th Mississippi Cavalry; 3rd Tennessee Cavalry (Forrest's Old Regiment); 7th Tennessee Cavalry; 12th Tennessee Cavalry; 14th Tennessee Cavalry: Ltc Raleigh R. White; 15th Tennessee Cavalry
Chalmers' Division; BG James R. Chalmers	Biffle's Brigade Col Jacob B. Biffle	4th Tennessee Cavalry; 9th Tennessee Cavalry; 10th Tennessee Cavalry
Buford's Division (Detached; at Murfreesboro); BG Abraham Buford	Bell's Brigade Col Tyree H. Bell	2nd/22nd Tennessee Cavalry (Barteau's); 19th Tennessee Cavalry; 20th Tennessee Cavalry; 21st Tennessee Cavalry; Nixon's Tennessee, Cavalry Regiment
Buford's Division (Detached; at Murfreesboro); BG Abraham Buford	Crossland's Brigade Col Edward Crossland	3rd Kentucky Mounted Infantry; 7th Kentucky Mounted Infantry; 8th Kentucky Mounted Infantry; 12th Kentucky Cavalry; Huey's Kentucky Battalion
Jackson's Division (Detached; at Murfreesboro); BG William H. Jackson	Armstrong's Brigade BG Frank C. Armstrong	1st Mississippi Cavalry; 2nd Mississippi Cavalry; 28th Mississippi Cavalry; Ballentine's Mississippi Regiment (2nd Partisan Rangers)
Jackson's Division (Detached; at Murfreesboro); BG William H. Jackson	Ross's Brigade BG Lawrence S. Ross	3rd Texas Cavalry; 6th Texas Cavalry; 9th Texas Cavalry; 27th Texas Cavalry (1st Texas Legion)
Artillery		Morton's Tennessee Battery
