= Chattanooga campaign order of battle: Confederate =

The following units and commanders fought in the Chattanooga–Ringgold campaign of the American Civil War on the Confederate side. The Union order of battle is shown separately. Order of battle compiled from the army organization on November 20, 1863 and the reports.

== Abbreviations used ==
=== Military rank ===
- Gen = General
- LTG = Lieutenant General
- MG = Major General
- BG = Brigadier General
- Col = Colonel
- Ltc = Lieutenant Colonel
- Maj = Major
- Cpt = Captain
- Lt = Lieutenant
- Sgt = Sergeant
- Cpl = Corporal

=== Other ===
- (w) = wounded
- (mw) = mortally wounded
- (k) = killed in action
- (c) = captured

== Army of Tennessee ==
Gen Braxton Bragg

Escort:

- 1st Louisiana (Regulars)
- 1st Louisiana Cavalry

=== Hardee's Corps ===
LTG William J. Hardee

Division	Brigade	Regiments and others
Cheatham's Division; MG Benjamin F. Cheatham; BG John K. Jackson	Jackson's Brigade BG John K. Jackson; Col John C. Wilkinson	1st Georgia (Confederate); 5th Georgia; 47th Georgia: Ltc Aaron C. Edwards; 65th Georgia; 2nd Georgia Battalion Sharpshooters; 5th Mississippi; 8th Mississippi: Col John C. Wilkinson
Cheatham's Division; MG Benjamin F. Cheatham; BG John K. Jackson	Moore's Brigade BG John C. Moore	37th Alabama: Ltc Alexander A. Greene; 40th Alabama: Col John H. Higley; 42nd Alabama: Ltc Thomas C. Lanier
Cheatham's Division; MG Benjamin F. Cheatham; BG John K. Jackson	Walthall's Brigade BG Edward C. Walthall (w)	24th Mississippi: Col William F. Dowd; 27th Mississippi: Col James A. Campbell (c), Ltc Andrew J. Jones; 29th Mississippi: Col William F. Brantley; 30th Mississippi: Maj James M. Johnson; 34th Mississippi: Col Samuel Benton, Cpt Jerome H. Bowen
Cheatham's Division; MG Benjamin F. Cheatham; BG John K. Jackson	Wright's Brigade BG Marcus J. Wright; Col John H. Anderson	8th Tennessee: Col John H. Anderson, Ltc Chris C. McKinney; 16th Tennessee: Col David McM. Donnell, Cpt Benjamin Randals; 28th Tennessee: Col Sidney S. Stanton; 51st-52nd Tennessee: Ltc John G. Hall
Cheatham's Division; MG Benjamin F. Cheatham; BG John K. Jackson	Artillery Battalion Maj Melancthon Smith	Fowler's (Alabama) Battery; McCants' (Florida) Battery; Scogin's (Georgia) Battery; Smith's (Mississippi) Battery
Hindman's Division; BG Patton Anderson	Anderson's Brigade Col William F. Tucker	7th Mississippi; 9th Mississippi; 10th Mississippi; 41st Mississippi; 44th Mississippi; 9th Mississippi Battalion Sharpshooters
Hindman's Division; BG Patton Anderson	Manigault's Brigade BG Arthur M. Manigault	24th Alabama; 28th Alabama; 34th Alabama; 10th-19th South Carolina
Hindman's Division; BG Patton Anderson	Deas' Brigade BG Zach C. Deas	19th Alabama; 22nd Alabama; 25th Alabama; 39th Alabama; 50th Alabama; 17th Alabama Battalion Sharpshooters
Hindman's Division; BG Patton Anderson	Vaughan's Brigade BG Alfred J. Vaughan, Jr.	11th Tennessee; 12th-47th Tennessee; 13th-154th Tennessee; 29th Tennessee
Hindman's Division; BG Patton Anderson	Artillery Battalion Maj Alfred R. Courtney	Dent's (Alabama) Battery; Garrity's (Alabama) Battery; Scott's (Tennessee) Battery; Waters' (Alabama) Battery
Buckner's Division; BG Bushrod R. Johnson	Johnson's Brigade Col John S. Fulton	17th-23rd Tennessee; 25th-44th Tennessee; 63rd Tennessee
Buckner's Division; BG Bushrod R. Johnson	Gracie's Brigade BG Archibald Gracie, Jr.	41st Alabama; 43rd Alabama; 1st Battalion, Hilliard's Alabama Legion; 2nd Battalion, Hilliard's Alabama Legion; 3rd Battalion, Hilliard's Alabama Legion; 4th Battalion, Hilliard's Alabama Legion
Buckner's Division; BG Bushrod R. Johnson	Reynolds' Brigade BG Alexander W. Reynolds	58th North Carolina; 60th North Carolina: Maj James T. Weaver; 54th Virginia; 63rd Virginia
Buckner's Division; BG Bushrod R. Johnson	Artillery Battalion Maj Samuel C. Williams	Darden's (Mississippi) Battery; Jeffress' (Virginia) Battery; Kolb's (Alabama) Battery: Cpt Reuben F. Kolb
Walker's Division; BG States R. Gist	Maney's Brigade BG George Maney (w)	1st-27th Tennessee: Col Hume R. Field; 4th Tennessee (Provisional Army); 6th-9th Tennessee; 41st Tennessee; 50th Tennessee: Col Cyrus A. Sugg (w); 24th Tennessee Battalion Sharpshooters
Walker's Division; BG States R. Gist	Gist's Brigade	46th Georgia; 8th Georgia Battalion; 16th South Carolina; 24th South Carolina
Walker's Division; BG States R. Gist	Wilson's Brigade	25th Georgia; 29th Georgia; 30th Georgia; 66th Georgia; 26th Georgia Battalion; 1st Georgia Battalion Sharpshooters
Walker's Division; BG States R. Gist	Artillery Battalion Maj Robert Martin	Bledsoe's (Missouri) Battery; Ferguson's (South Carolina) Battery; Howell's (Georgia) Battery: Lt R. T. Gibson

=== Breckinridge's Corps ===
MG John C. Breckinridge

Division	Brigade	Regiments and others
Cleburne's Division; MG Patrick Cleburne	Liddell's Brigade Col Daniel C. Govan	2nd-15th-24th Arkansas: Maj Elisha Warfield; 5th-13th Arkansas: Col John E. Murray; 6th-7th Arkansas: Ltc Peter Snyder; 8th-19th Arkansas: Ltc Augustus S. Hutchison
Cleburne's Division; MG Patrick Cleburne	Smith's Brigade BG James A. Smith (w); Col Hiram B. Granbury	6th-10th Texas-15th Texas Cavalry (dismounted): Col Roger Q. Mills (w), Cpt John R. Kennard; 7th Texas: Col Hiram B. Granbury, Cpt Charles E. Talley; 17th-18th-24th-25th Texas Cavalry (dismounted): Maj William A. Taylor
Cleburne's Division; MG Patrick Cleburne	Polk's Brigade BG Lucius E. Polk	1st Arkansas: Col John W. Colquitt, Ltc William H. Martin (w); 3rd-5th Confederate: Ltc James C. Cole (w), Cpt W. A. Brown, Cpt Mumford H. Dixon; 2nd Tennessee: Col William D. Robison (w), Ltc William J. Hale; 35th-48thTennessee
Cleburne's Division; MG Patrick Cleburne	Lowrey's Brigade BG Mark P. Lowrey	16th Alabama: Maj Frederick A. Ashford; 33rd Alabama: Col Samuel Adams; 45th Alabama: Ltc Harris D. Lampley; 32nd-45th Mississippi: Col Aaron B. Hardcastle; 15th Mississippi Battalion Sharpshooters: Cpt Thomas M. Steger
Cleburne's Division; MG Patrick Cleburne	Artillery Battalion Maj Thomas R. Hotchkiss; Cpt James P. Douglas	Calvert's (Arkansas) Battery: Lt Thomas J. Key; Douglas' (Texas) Battery: Cpt James P. Douglas, Lt John H. Bingham; Semple's (Alabama) Battery: Lt Richard W. Goldthwaite; Swett's (Mississippi) Battery: Lt Harvey Shannon (w), Lt Joseph Ashton (mw), Cpl F. M. Williams
Stewart's Division; MG Alexander P. Stewart	Adams' Brigade Col Randall L. Gibson	13th-20th Louisiana; 16th-25th Louisiana; 19th Louisiana; 4th Louisiana Battalion; 14th Louisiana Battalion Sharpshooters: Maj John E. Austin
Stewart's Division; MG Alexander P. Stewart	Strahl's Brigade BG Otho F. Strahl	4th-5th Tennessee; 19th Tennessee; 24th Tennessee; 31st Tennessee; 33rd Tennessee
Stewart's Division; MG Alexander P. Stewart	Clayton's Brigade Col James T. Holtzclaw	18th Alabama; 32nd-58th Alabama; 36th Alabama; 38th Alabama
Stewart's Division; MG Alexander P. Stewart	Stovall's Brigade BG Marcellus A. Stovall	40th Georgia; 41st Georgia; 42nd Georgia; 43rd Georgia; 52nd Georgia
Stewart's Division; MG Alexander P. Stewart	Artillery Battalion Cpt Henry C. Semple	Dawson's (Georgia) Battery; Humphreys' (Arkansas) Battery; Oliver's (Alabama) Battery; Stanford's (Mississippi) Battery
Breckinridge's Division; BG William B. Bate
Breckinridge's Division; BG William B. Bate	Lewis' Brigade BG Joseph H. Lewis	2nd Kentucky; 4th Kentucky; 5th Kentucky; 6th Kentucky; 9th Kentucky; Provisional Cavalry Battalion (dismounted)
Breckinridge's Division; BG William B. Bate	Bate's Brigade Col Robert C. Tyler (w); Col Anthony F. Rudler (w); Ltc James J. Turner	37th Georgia: Col Anthony F. Rudler, Ltc Joseph T. Smith; 4th Georgia Battalion Sharpshooters; 10th Tennessee: Maj John O'Neill; 15th-37th Tennessee: Maj John M. Wall; 20th Tennessee; 30th Tennessee: Ltc James J. Turner; 1st Tennessee Battalion
Breckinridge's Division; BG William B. Bate	Florida (Finley's) Brigade BG Jesse J. Finley	1st-3rd Florida: Ltc Elisha Mashburn; 4th Florida: Ltc Edward Badger; 6th Florida: Ltc Angus D. McLean; 7th Florida; 1st Florida Cavalry (dismounted)
Breckinridge's Division; BG William B. Bate	Artillery Battalion Cpt Cuthbert H. Slocomb	Cobb's (Kentucky) Battery; Mebane's (Tennessee) Battery; Slocomb's (Louisiana) Battery
Stevenson's Division; MG Carter L. Stevenson; BG John C. Brown	Brown's Brigade BG John C. Brown	3rd Tennessee; 18th-26th Tennessee: Ltc William R. Butler, Maj William H. Joyner (w); 32nd Tennessee: Maj John P. McGuire; 45th Tennessee-23rd Tennessee Battalion: Col Anderson Searcy
Stevenson's Division; MG Carter L. Stevenson; BG John C. Brown	Cumming's Brigade BG Alfred Cumming	34th Georgia: Col James A. W. Johnson (w), Ltc Joseph W. Bradley; 36th Georgia: Ltc Alexander M. Wallace (w), Cpt Jacob L. Morgan; 39th Georgia: Col Joseph T. McConnell (mw); 56th Georgia: Ltc John T. Slaughter (w), Cpt John A. Grice
Stevenson's Division; MG Carter L. Stevenson; BG John C. Brown	Pettus's Brigade BG Edmund W. Pettus	20th Alabama: Cpt John W. Davis; 23rd Alabama; 30th Alabama: Col Charles M. Shelley; 31st Alabama: Col Daniel R. Hundley; 46th Alabama
Stevenson's Division; MG Carter L. Stevenson; BG John C. Brown	Artillery Battalion Cpt William W. Carnes	Baxter's (Tennessee) Battery; Carnes's (Tennessee) Battery; Corput's (Georgia) Battery: Cpt Max van den Corput; Rowan's (Georgia) Battery

=== Wheeler's Cavalry Corps ===
MG Joseph Wheeler

Division	Brigade	Regiments and others
Wharton's Division; MG John A. Wharton	First Brigade Col Thomas Harrison	3rd Arkansas; 6th North Carolina; 8th Texas; 11th Texas
Wharton's Division; MG John A. Wharton	Second Brigade BG Henry B. Davidson	1st Tennessee; 2nd Tennessee; 4th Tennessee; 6th Tennessee; 11th Tennessee
Martin's Division; BG William T. Martin	First Brigade BG John T. Morgan	1st Alabama; 3rd Alabama; 4th (Russell's) Alabama; Malone's (Alabama) Regiment; 51st Alabama
Martin's Division; BG William T. Martin	Second Brigade Col James J. Morrison	1st Georgia; 2nd Georgia; 3rd Georgia; 4th Georgia; 6th Georgia
Armstrong's Division; BG Frank C. Armstrong	First Brigade BG William Y.C. Humes	4th (Baxter Smith's) Tennessee; 5th Tennessee; 8th (Dibrell's) Tennessee; 9th Tennessee; 10th Tennessee
Armstrong's Division; BG Frank C. Armstrong	Second Brigade Col Charles H. Tyler	Clay's (Kentucky) Battalion; Edmundson's (Virginia) Battalion; Jessee's (Kentucky) Battalion; Johnson's (Kentucky) Battalion
Kelly's Division; BG John H. Kelly	First Brigade Col William B. Wade	1st Confederate; 3rd Confederate; 8th Confederate; 10th Confederate
Kelly's Division; BG John H. Kelly	Second Brigade Col John W. Grigsby	2nd Kentucky; 3rd Kentucky; 9th Kentucky; Allison's Tennessee Squadron; Hamilton's Tennessee Battalion; Rucker's Tennessee Legion: Col Edmund W. Rucker
	Artillery	Huggins' (Tennessee) Battery; Huwald's (Tennessee) Battery; White's (Tennessee) Battery; Wiggins' (Arkansas) Battery

=== Reserve artillery ===
Battalions	Batteries
Robertson's Battalion Maj Felix H. Robertson	Barret's (Missouri) Battery; Havis' (Georgia) Battery; Lumsden's (Alabama) Battery; Massenburg's (Georgia) Battery
