= Siege of Corinth order of battle: Confederate =

The following units and commanders of the Confederate Army fought at the Siege of Corinth (29 Apr-30 May 1862) of the American Civil War. The Union order of battle is shown separately. Order of battle compiled from the Official Records of the American Civil War as they appeared on June 30, 1862.

== Abbreviations used ==
=== Military Rank ===
- Gen = General
- LTG = Lieutenant General
- MG = Major General
- BG = Brigadier General
- Col = Colonel
- Ltc = Lieutenant Colonel
- Maj = Major
- Cpt = Captain
- Lt = Lieutenant

=== Other ===
- w = wounded
- mw = mortally wounded
- k = killed

== Department Number Two ==
Gen Pierre G. T. Beauregard

=== Army of Tennessee ===
Gen Braxton Bragg

==== I Corps ====
MG Leonidas Polk

Division	Brigade	Regiments and Others
First Division; BG Charles Clark BG James H. Trapier	1st Brigade Col Robert M. Russell	12th Tennessee; 13th Tennessee; 47th Tennessee; 154th Tennessee; Bankhead's (Tennessee) Battery
First Division; BG Charles Clark BG James H. Trapier	2nd Brigade BG Alexander P. Stewart	13th Arkansas; 4th Tennessee; 5th Tennessee; 31st Tennessee; 33rd Tennessee; Stanford's (Mississippi) Battery
Second Division; BG Benjamin F. Cheatham	1st Brigade BG Daniel S. Donelson	8th Tennessee; 15th Tennessee; 16th Tennessee; 51st Tennessee; Carnes' (Alabama) Battery
Second Division; BG Benjamin F. Cheatham	2nd Brigade BG George Maney	1st Tennessee; 6th Tennessee; 9th Tennessee; 27th Tennessee; Smith's Battery
Second Division; BG Benjamin F. Cheatham	Detached Brigade BG Samuel B. Maxey	41st Georgia; 24th Mississippi; 9th Texas; Eldridge Wright's (Tennessee) Battery

==== II Corps ====
MG Thomas C. Hindman until 2 June
MG Samuel Jones

Division	Brigade	Regiments and Other
First Division BG Daniel Ruggles	1st Brigade BG J. Patton Anderson	Florida & Confederate Battalion: Cpt William C. Beard; 4th Louisiana; 17th Louisiana; 25th Louisiana; 30th Mississippi; 36th Mississippi; 41st Mississippi: Col William F. Tucker; Hodgson's (Louisiana) Battery
First Division BG Daniel Ruggles	2nd Brigade BG Alfred Mouton	11th Louisiana; 16th Louisiana; 18th Louisiana; 19th Louisiana; 13th (Orleans Guard) Louisiana Battalion; Ducatel's (Louisiana) Battery
First Division BG Daniel Ruggles	3rd Brigade BG Lucius M. Walker	37th (34th) Mississippi: Col Samuel Benton; 13th Louisiana; 20th Louisiana; 21st Louisiana; 24th (Crescent) Louisiana; Burnett's (Alabama) Battery
First Division BG Daniel Ruggles	3rd Brigade BG John C. Moore	1st Arkansas: Col James F. Fagan; 2nd Texas; 38th Tennessee; 51st Tennessee; Lumsden's (Alabama) Battery; Barret's (Missouri) Battery
Second Division MG Jones M. Withers BG James H. Trapier	1st Brigade BG Franklin Gardner	1st Louisiana Regulars; 19th Alabama; 22nd Alabama; 25th Alabama; 26th Alabama (Coltart's); 39th Alabama; 17th Alabama Sharpshooters Battalion; Robertson's (Alabama) Battery
Second Division MG Jones M. Withers BG James H. Trapier	2nd Brigade BG James R. Chalmers	5th Mississippi; 7th Mississippi; 9th Mississippi; 10th Mississippi; 29th Mississippi; 36th Mississippi; Ketchum's (Alabama) Battery
Second Division MG Jones M. Withers BG James H. Trapier	3rd Brigade BG John K. Jackson	5th Georgia; 17th Alabama; 18th Alabama; 21st Alabama; 24th Alabama; Burtwell's (Alabama) Battery
Second Division MG Jones M. Withers BG James H. Trapier	4th Brigade BG James H. Trapier; Col Arthur M. Manigault	Blythe's (1st) Mississippi Battalion; 28th Alabama; 34th Alabama; 10th South Carolina: Col Arthur M. Manigault; 19th South Carolina; Waters' (Alabama) Battery

==== III Corps ====
MG William J. Hardee

Brigade	Regiments and Other
1st Brigade BG St. John R. Liddell	2nd Arkansas; 5th Arkansas; 6th Arkansas; 7th Arkansas; 8th Arkansas; Roberts' (Arkansas) Battery; Pioneer Company
2nd Brigade BG Patrick Cleburne	15th Arkansas; 2nd Tennessee; 35th Tennessee; 24th Tennessee; 48th Tennessee; Calvert's (Arkansas) Battery
3rd Brigade BG S. A. M. Wood	16th Alabama; 32nd Mississippi; 33rd Mississippi; 44th Tennessee; Baxter's (Tennessee) Battery
4th Brigade BG John S. Marmaduke	3rd Confederate; 25th Tennessee; 29th Tennessee; 37th Tennessee; Swett's (Mississippi) Battery
5th Brigade Col Alexander T. Hawthorn	33rd Alabama; 17th Tennessee; 21st Tennessee; 23rd Tennessee; Austin's (Arkansas) Battery

==== Reserve Corps ====
MG John C. Breckinridge

Brigade	Regiments and Other
1st Brigade BG James M. Hawes	31st Alabama; 4th Alabama Battalion; 4th Kentucky; 5th (9th) Kentucky; Bryne's Mississippi Battery
2nd Brigade BG Benjamin H. Helm	35th Alabama; 3rd Kentucky; 6th Kentucky: Col Joseph H. Lewis; 7th Kentucky; Cobb's Kentucky Battery
3rd Brigade: BG John S. Bowen	9th Arkansas; 10th Arkansas; 2nd Confederate; 1st Missouri; Watson's (Louisiana) Battery
4th Brigade Col Walter S. Statham	15th Mississippi; 22nd Mississippi; 19th Tennessee; 20th Tennessee; 28th Tennessee; 45th Tennessee; McClung's (Tennessee) Battery

=== Army of the West ===
MG Earl Van Dorn

Division	Brigade	Regiments and Others
First Division; BG Samuel Jones; BG Lewis H. Little	1st Brigade BG Lewis H. Little; BG John C. Moore	16th Arkansas Infantry: Col David Provence; 2nd Missouri Infantry; 3rd Missouri Infantry; Battalion of Missouri Infantry; 1st Missouri Cavalry (dismounted): Col Elijah Gates; Wade's (Missouri) Battery: Cpt William Wade
First Division; BG Samuel Jones; BG Lewis H. Little	2nd Brigade BG Louis Hébert; Col John W. Whitfield	14th Arkansas Infantry; 17th Arkansas Infantry; 3rd Louisiana Infantry; Whitfield's Texas Legion (dismounted): Col John W. Whitfield; 3rd Texas Cavalry (dismounted): Col Elkanah Greer; MacDonald's (Missouri) Battery: Cpt Emmett McDonald
First Division; BG Samuel Jones; BG Lewis H. Little	3rd Brigade BG Martin E. Green	4th Missouri Infantry; Battalion Missouri Infantry; Battalion Missouri Cavalry (dismounted); Confederate Rangers (dismounted); Clark's Battery: Cpt Houston King; Kneisley's (Missouri) Battery: Cpt James Kneisley
Second Division; BG Sterling Price; BG John P. McCown	1st Brigade BG Joseph L. Hogg (died May 16); BG William L. Cabell	McCray's Arkansas Infantry; 10th Texas Cavalry (dismounted); 11th Texas Cavalry (dismounted); 14th Texas Cavalry (dismounted); Andrews's 32d Texas Cavalry (dismounted); Good's Texas Battery: Cpt John Jay Good
Second Division; BG Sterling Price; BG John P. McCown	2nd Brigade BG Thomas J. Churchill	4th Arkansas Infantry; 1st Arkansas Riflemen (dismounted); 2nd Arkansas Riflemen (dismounted); 4th Arkansas Infantry Battalion; Turnbull's (11th) Arkansas Infantry Battalion; Reeves’ Missouri State Guard Cavalry Scouts; 1st Arkansas Battery: Cpt David Provence (until 6 May), Lt John T. Humphreys
Third Division; BG Dabney H. Maury	1st Brigade Col Thomas P. Dockery	18th Arkansas Infantry; 19th Arkansas Infantry; 20th Arkansas Infantry; McCairns’ Arkansas Battalion; Unknown battery
Third Division; BG Dabney H. Maury	2nd Brigade BG John C. Moore	Hobbs’ Arkansas Infantry; Adams’ Arkansas Infantry; 35th Mississippi Infantry; 2nd Texas Infantry; Bledsoe's (Missouri) Battery: Cpt Hiram Bledsoe
Third Division; BG Dabney H. Maury	3rd Brigade Col Charles W. Phifer	3rd Arkansas Cavalry (dismounted); 6th Texas Cavalry (dismounted); 9th Texas Cavalry (dismounted); Brooks’ (1st) Arkansas Cavalry Battalion; McNally's (Arkansas) Battery
Artillery Brigade	Clark's Battalion Maj Meriwether Lewis Clark	Clarks's (Missouri) Battery: Cpt Houston King; Kneisley's (Missouri) Battery: Cpt James Kneisley; Landis's (Missouri) Battery: Cpt John C. Landis

== Sources ==
- U.S. War Department, The War of the Rebellion: a Compilation of the Official Records of the Union and Confederate Armies, U.S. Government Printing Office, 1880–1901.
- Eicher, John H., and David J. Eicher. Civil War High Commands. Stanford, California: Stanford University Press, 2001. ISBN 0-8047-3641-3.
