= Chattanooga campaign order of battle =

The order of battle for the Chattanooga campaign includes:

- Chattanooga campaign order of battle: Confederate
- Chattanooga campaign order of battle: Union

== See also ==
- Battle of Chattanooga (disambiguation)
