= Battle of Nashville order of battle =

The order of battle for the Battle of Nashville includes:

- Battle of Nashville order of battle: Confederate
- Battle of Nashville order of battle: Union
