= William F. Brantley =

William Felix Brantley
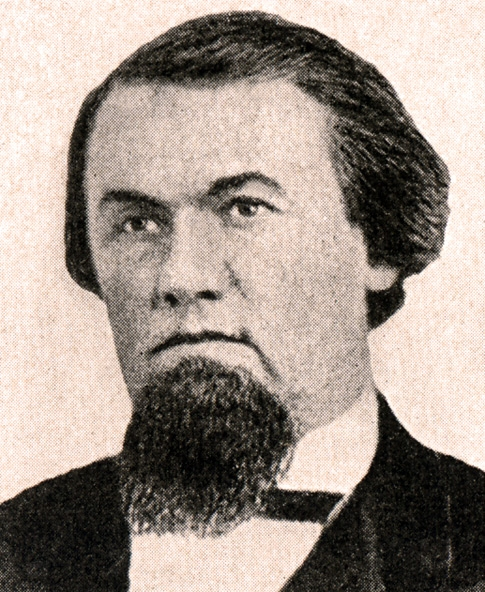
- William Felix Brantley
- Born: March 12, 1830; Greene County, Alabama
- Died: November 2, 1870 (aged 40) near Winona, Mississippi
- Burial place: Old Greensboro Cemetery, Webster County, Mississippi
- Military career
- Allegiance: Confederate States of America
- Branch: Confederate States Army
- Service years: 1861–65
- Rank: Brigadier General
- Units: Brantley's Brigade; 29th Mississippi Infantry Regiment
- Conflicts: American Civil War

William Felix Brantley (March 12, 1830 – November 2, 1870) was an American lawyer, slaveowner, and Confederate General. Brantley led an infantry brigade in the Western theater of the American Civil War and was killed in a feud by unknown assailants in 1870.

== Early life and career ==
William Felix Brantley was born in 1830 in Greene County, Alabama, but moved with his family to Mississippi while still a child. He was a son of William Brantley, originally from Georgia, and his wife Marina (née Jolly) of Alabama. By 1850 Brantley was studying law in Carroll County, Mississippi. Two years later he began practicing as a lawyer in the former county seat and now non-existent town of Greensboro in Webster County, Mississippi.

On December 27, 1855, Brantley married Cornelia S. Medley, and the couple had three children together. They were: Mary Thomas, born September 5, 1858, in Macon and died June 11, 1943, in St. Louis, Missouri; Joseph Ransom, born September 5, 1859, in Choctaw County and died there on September 19, 1869; and an unnamed infant born in 1861 and died on June 7 of that year.

By 1860 Brantley was a practicing lawyer in Choctaw County, Mississippi. He and his family lived with one of his brothers, Dr. John Ransom Brantley. He held twenty one people as slaves in 1860, and in January 1861 he represented his county during the Mississippi state secession convention.

== American Civil War ==
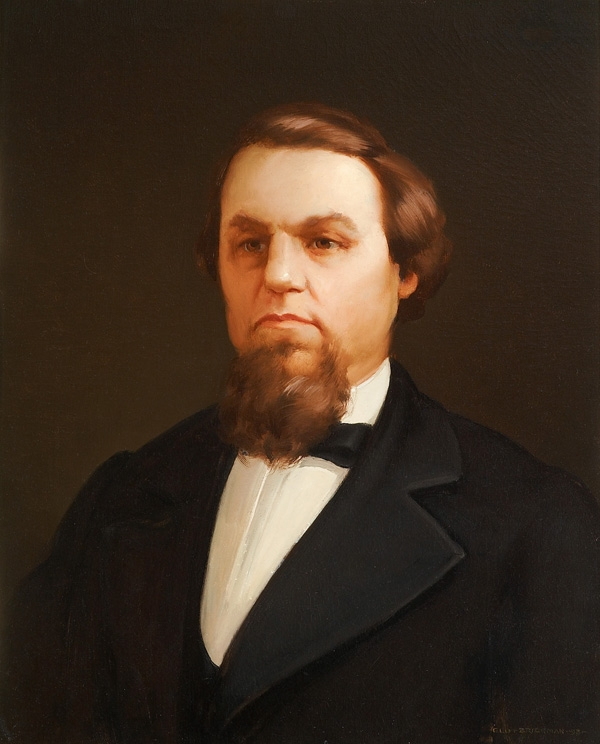
Portrait of William F. Brantley by George Brant Bridgman

Brantley's home state of Mississippi seceded from the Union in January, 1861, and war broke out between the Northern and Southern states in April. On April 20, Brantley enlisted in Mississippi's armed forces, and was elected as captain of a company called the Wigfall Rifles, which was mustered into Confederate service as Company D of the 15th Mississippi Infantry Regiment The 15th Mississippi fought in Kentucky and Tennessee, including the Battle of Shiloh in April, 1862 where Brantley was wounded.

The initial 1-year term of enlistment for his original regiment expired in the spring of 1862, and Brantley was elected to join the 29th Mississippi Infantry Regiment as Lieutenant Colonel. He fought with his new regiment at the Battle of Stones River in Tennessee, in which he was wounded, hit in the shoulder on December 31.

Brantley led his regiment (now part of the Confederate Army of Tennessee) during the Battle of Chickamauga from September 19–20, 1863, and with distinction in the Chattanooga campaign that October and November. In his commander's report about the subsequent Battle of Lookout Mountain, Brantley was praised for his conduct:

It is due in particular to commend Col. W. F. Brantley, Twenty-ninth Mississippi regiment and Lieut.-Col. McKelvaine, Twenty-fourth Mississippi regiment, for the skill, activity, zeal and courage I have ever observed in them under similar circumstances, but which in an especial degree signaled their actions on this occasion."

Brantley's wife Cornelia died during his wartime service in 1863. He led his regiment into the Atlanta campaign in the spring and summer of 1864. In the inconclusive Battle of Resaca on May 13–15, Colonel Brantley was again noted for his performance, "commended for gallantry, after leading a charge on the enemy that repulsed Federal assaults three times." During the Battle of Atlanta on July 22, 1864, his brigade commander, Col. Samuel Benton, was mortally wounded, hit in his chest and right foot by a shell. Brantley then took command of the brigade, and would lead it for the rest of the war.

On July 26 Brantley was promoted to the rank of brigadier general. He led his brigade during the Franklin-Nashville Campaign in Tennessee in late 1864. At the Second Battle of Franklin on November 30, Brantley's command consisted of the 24th, 27th, 29th, 30th, and the 34th Mississippi Infantry regiments, plus a dismounted cavalry company.

By 1865, Brantley's command and the remnant of the Army of Tennessee participated in the war's last phase in the Carolinas campaign. General Brantley surrendered along with his commanding officer General Joseph E. Johnston in North Carolina on April 26. He was paroled on May 1 from Greensboro after the surrender, and returned home to Mississippi.

== Postbellum and death ==
After the war ended in 1865, Brantley resumed his law practice in Mississippi. The widower remarried, to a woman named Julia. They had a son born in 1869, but he died on November 10 that same year; no name was recorded for the infant.

Brantley was part of a family feud, which resulted in his own death by murder. An account of his involvement follows:

William’s brother, Dr. John Ransom Brantley was killed in Gonzales, Texas, in 1859. The brothers’ reprisal for this act, led to other murders. On August 16, 1870, William’s brother, Arnold J. Brantley, was shot in cold blood, according to reports. The Weekly Clarion newspaper stated in November 1870 that it was the General’s attempt to bring to justice the party responsible for this murder that led to his own death. He was shot and killed near Winona, Mississippi on November 2, 1870 as he drove his buggy from town toward his home. None of the assassins were ever apprehended.

He was buried in a cemetery "behind the church at Old Greensboro" - (in the former first county seat and now non-existent town of Greensboro), - about three miles north of Tomnolen, Webster County, Mississippi."

== See also ==
- List of American Civil War generals (Confederate)
