= Samuel Benton =

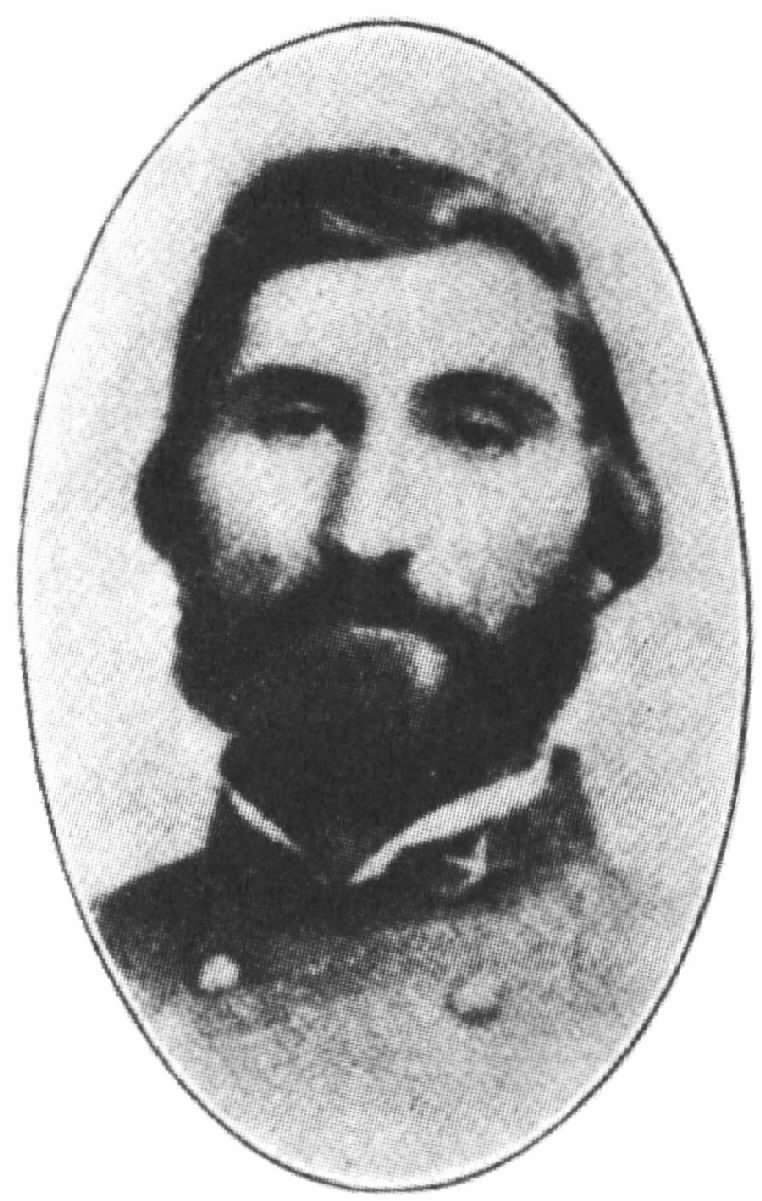
- Col. Samuel Benton

Member of the Mississippi House of Representatives
- In office 1852–1854

Personal details
- Born: October 18, 1820 Williamson County, Tennessee
- Died: July 28, 1864 (aged 43) Griffin, Georgia
- Resting place: Hillcrest Cemetery; Holly Springs, Mississippi
- Spouse: Rowena Knox
- Children: 2

Military service
- Allegiance: Confederate States
- Branch/service: Confederate States Army
- Years of service: 1861–1864
- Rank: Colonel
- Commands: 34th Mississippi Infantry Regiment; Walthall's Brigade
- Battles/wars: American Civil War: Heartland Offensive / Kentucky Campaign; Chattanooga campaign; Atlanta campaign; Battle of Resaca; Battle of Atlanta †

Samuel Benton (October 18, 1820– July 28, 1864) was an American attorney, newspaper publisher and politician. He served as a colonel in the Confederate States Army during the American Civil War. He was promoted to brigadier general but died of wounds received in the Battle of Atlanta before the notification of his promotion reached him.

== Early life ==
Samuel Benton was born on October 18, 1820, in Williamson County, Tennessee. He was a nephew of Thomas Hart Benton, a US Senator from Missouri. Samuel Benton studied law and became a prominent lawyer in Holly Springs, Mississippi. He was also the publisher of a newspaper there, The Mississippi Times, first published in April 1853.

In politics, Benton was a Whig, and he served one term in the state House of Representatives in 1852. He was a delegate to the Mississippi Secession Convention of January 1861, where he voted in favor of leaving the Union.

== Civil War ==
During the American Civil War, Benton enlisted for Mississippi state service in early 1861. He was elected captain in the "Old" 9th Mississippi Infantry, a 12 month regiment. In March 1861 the regiment went to Mobile, Alabama, then to Pensacola, Florida. When the enlistments of the original 9th Regiment soldiers expired, Benton was elected Colonel of the 34th Mississippi Infantry Regiment. The Regiment saw its first service under Major General Earl Van Dorn, during his attempt to drive back the Union Army during the movement to Corinth, Mississippi after the Battle of Shiloh. Colonel Benton was commended, as was the regiment for its behavior during the engagement.

Benton and the 34th Mississippi Infantry accompanied General Braxton Bragg's army to Tennessee and fought at the Battle of Perryville, where the 34th suffered heavy losses. Benton was wounded, and his lieutenant colonel and major were both permanently disabled. Due to his wounds, Benton was absent from the September 1863 Battle of Chickamauga. He was back in command at the Battle of Lookout Mountain, where the regiment was on the picket line at the base of the mountain. The 34th was overrun by four columns of Union infantry, and around 200 men were captured.

In the Atlanta campaign, Benton commanded a brigade made up of the 29th, 30th, and 34th Mississippi infantry regiments at the Battle of Alt's Gap and the Battle of Resaca. The brigade was flanked by Union artillery, suffered heavy losses while holding their position.

When Major General Edward C. Walthall was promoted to division command, Col. Benton was given the brigade. At the Battle of Atlanta on July 22, 1864, Benton was severely wounded in the chest by a shell fragment and wounded in the right foot, causing the amputation of his leg.

== Death and legacy ==
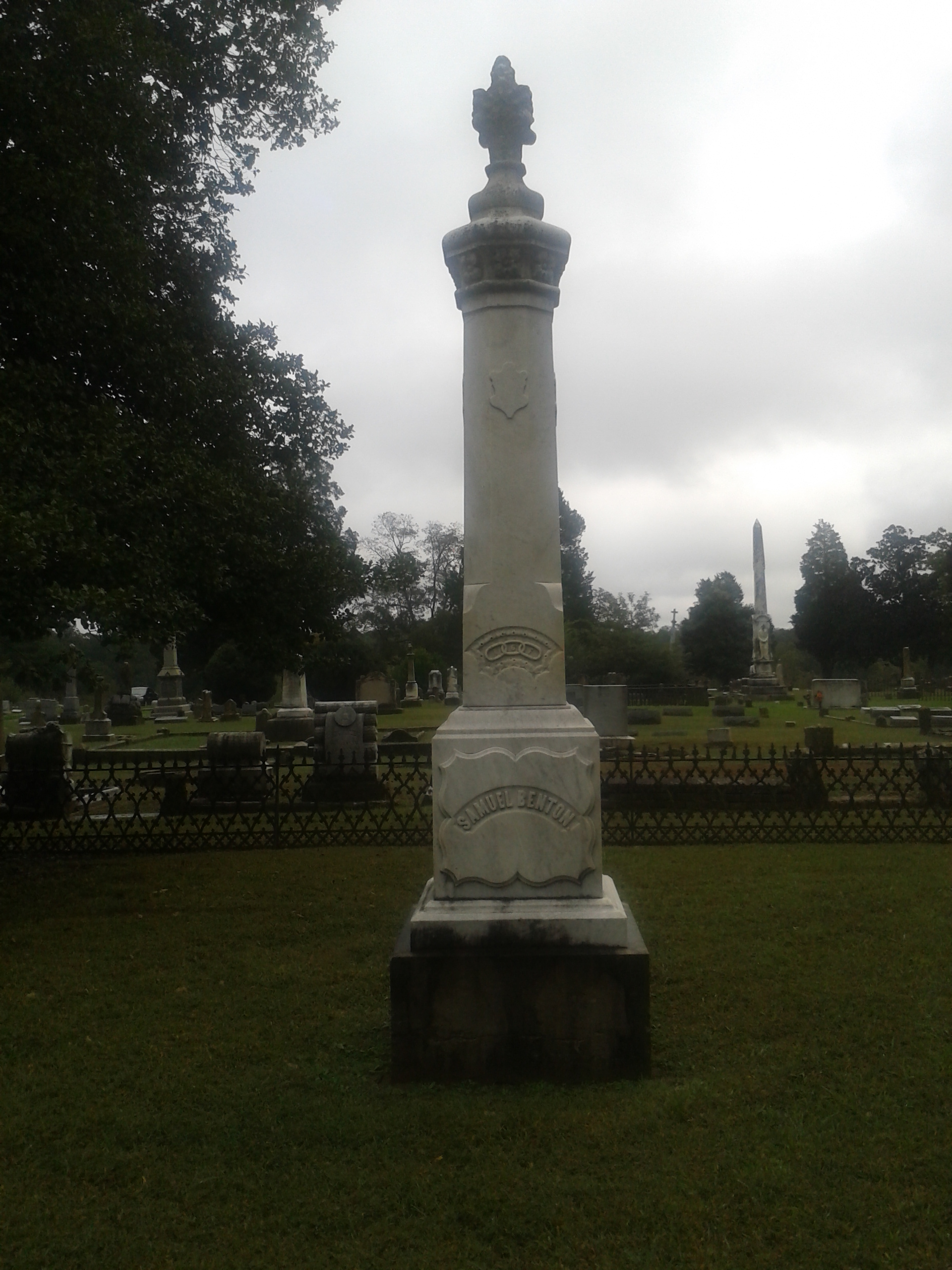
Benton's grave in Hillcrest Cemetery

Benton died six days later on July 28 in a military hospital in Griffin, Georgia. News of his promotion to brigadier general, dated two days earlier, never reached him. Due to his death, his appointment was not confirmed by the Confederate States Congress.

Samuel Benton was buried at Griffin, Georgia, and reinterred after the war in Hillcrest Cemetery in Holly Springs, Mississippi. He was survived by his wife, the former Rowena Knox, and two children.

Benton County, Mississippi, established in 1870, was named for Samuel Benton.

== See also ==
- Thomas Hart Benton, his uncle
- List of American Civil War generals (Acting Confederate)
