= Peter Kappesser =

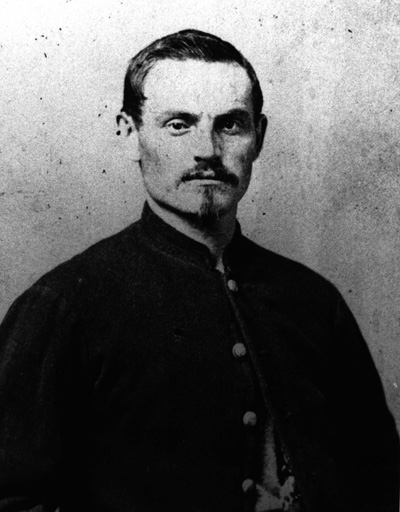
- Peter Kappesser
- Born: c. 1839; Germany
- Died: May 31, 1930 (aged 90–91); Syracuse, New York
- Burial place: Woodlawn Cemetery in Syracuse, New York
- Military career
- Allegiance: United States of America; Union
- Branch: United States Army; Union Army
- Service years: 1862 - 1865
- Rank: Private
- Unit: 149th New York Volunteer Infantry Regiment
- Conflicts: American Civil War
- Awards: Medal of Honor

Peter Kappesser was a soldier in the United States Army who received the Medal of Honor for his actions during the American Civil War.

== Biography ==
Peter Kappesser enlisted in the US army from Syracuse, New York on August 31, 1862. He received the Medal of Honor on November 24, 1863 for the capture of the regimental flag of the 34th Mississippi Infantry Regiment at the Battle of Lookout Mountain, Tennessee on November 24, 1863.

Private Peter Kappesser was one of twenty men cited for personal valor in the fighting in and around Chattanooga, Tennessee, November 24 & 25, 1863. On November 24 he was one of four men of the 149th New York Infantry Regiment to earn the award for his valor at Lookout Mountain. Private Kappesser's company surprised a Confederate camp at breakfast and the enemy color sergeant and his color guard attempted to retreat under cover of nearby rocks. Private Kappesser boldly rushed their position, demanding their surrender, and taking their flag. He tore the flag from its staff, thrust the bunting under his coat, and then returned to the battle in order to reach a wounded comrade and carry him from the battlefield. In the cold of that night, Private Kappesser used his captured Confederate flag as a scarf around his neck, then continued to do so until the end of the battle at Missionary Ridge, whereupon he gave the flag to the commander of his regiment.

The Confederate battle flag, as described by Lt. Colonel C.B. Randall in his Commander's Report of the action, was "...3 feet and 2 inches in length, 2 feet 8 inches in width, white border 1½ inches deep, dark blue ground-work, with round white center 14½ inches in diameter".

Kappesser mustered out with his regiment in June 1865. After the war he was a member of the William Lilly Post of the GAR, Syracuse, New York, and served as its Quartermaster.

He is buried at Woodlawn Cemetery in Syracuse, New York near the area reserved for the William Lilly GAR (Grand Army of the Republic) Post.

Historical Note: During the Civil War, the uniquely German immigrant Company B of the New York 149th, to which Kappesser was assigned, took part in the following battles and actions: Chancellorsville, Gettysburg, Wauhatchie, Lookout Mountain, Ringgold, Resaca, New Hope Church, Lost Mountain, Pine Knob, Kennesaw Mountain, Peach Tree Creek and the siege of Savannah; and they were present at the battles of Missionary Ridge, Rocky Face Ridge, Averasboro, Bentonville and The Carolinas. In total they lost 133 dead and 353 wounded.

== Obituary ==
Newspaper obituary in Syracuse, New York dated June 2, 1930: "Peter Kappesser, Holder of Medal of Honor, Dies After Operation". He died of appendicitis at age 91 on May 31, 1930. At the time of his death, he was the last surviving Civil War veteran of the 149th Infantry, Co. B, in Syracuse. A native of Germany, he came to Syracuse at the age of 13.

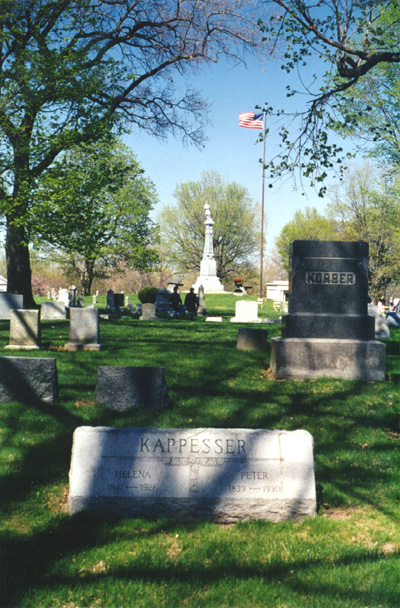
Peter Kappesser Grave

== Medal of Honor citation ==
Rank and organization: Private, Company B, 149th New York Infantry. Place and date: At Lookout Mountain, Tenn., November 24, 1863. Entered service at: Syracuse, N.Y. Birth: Germany. Date of issue: June 28, 1865.

Citation:

Capture of Confederate flag (Bragg's army).

== See also ==
- List of Medal of Honor recipients
- List of American Civil War Medal of Honor recipients: G–L
- "Homepage of the Family Kappesser (german)".
