= 34th Mississippi Infantry Regiment =

19th century confederate infantry unit from Mississippi

- Active: 1862–1865
- Country: Confederate States
- Allegiance: Mississippi
- Branch: Confederate States Army
- Type: Infantry
- Size: Regiment
- Battles: American Civil War: Siege of Corinth; Battle of Perryville; Battle of Chickamauga; Battle of Lookout Mountain; Atlanta Campaign; Carolinas Campaign

Commanders
- Notable commanders: Samuel Benton

The 34th Mississippi Infantry Regiment was a unit of the Confederate States Army in the American Civil War. The 34th Infantry was formed in 1862 from North Mississippi volunteer companies, and fought in many major battles of the Western theater. After taking heavy losses during battles in Tennessee and Georgia, the regiment surrendered in North Carolina in April 1865.

== History ==
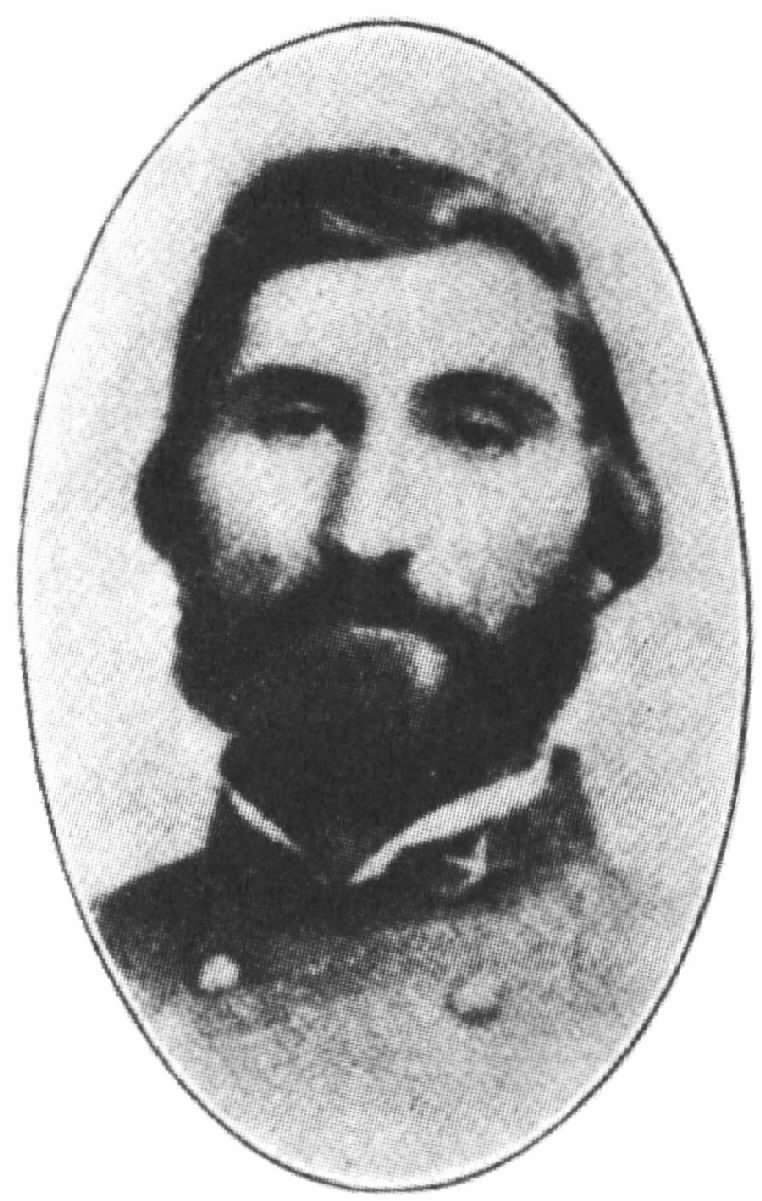
Colonel Samuel Benton of the 34th Mississippi, died of wounds in the 1864 Atlanta Campaign.

The 34th Mississippi Infantry was organized at Holly Springs in April, 1862. It was briefly designated as the 37th Mississippi, but another unrelated unit received that regimental number and was known by that name for the rest of the war. The colonel of the 34th Regiment, Samuel Benton, had previously served in the 9th Mississippi, a 12 month regiment whose original term of service had expired in 1862.

The new regiment was sent to Corinth, Mississippi a vital railway junction in North Mississippi that Federal forces were intent on capturing during the Siege of Corinth. The 34th's first combat action took place at Farmington on May 9 as Union forces were approaching Corinth. The town was abandoned by the Confederates, and their forces moved into Tennessee later that year, with the Regiment taking part in the October 1862 Battle of Perryville. In this battle the 34th Mississippi took heavy casualties, with all 3 field officers wounded, resulting in two of them being permanently disabled. Company K of the regiment only had 7 men fit for duty after this battle, from a nominal company size of 100-110 men.

Transferred to General Edward C. Walthall's brigade, the next major action of the regiment was at the September 1863 Battle of Chickamauga in Georgia. Once again the 34th came under heavy fire, losing 15 killed, 91 wounded and 19 missing of the 307 men engaged in this battle. In the Battle of Lookout Mountain in November, a large number of men from the 34th were cut off and captured by Union troops. Peter Kappesser, a Union soldier of the 149th New York, was awarded the Medal of Honor for capturing the regimental flag of the 34th Mississippi at Lookout Mountain. In the 1864 Atlanta Campaign, Colonel Benton of the 34th commanded a brigade made up of his regiment, the 29th, and the 30th Mississippi regiments. This command fought in numerous battles around Atlanta, including Resaca, New Hope Church, and Jonesborough. Colonel Benton was severely wounded at the Battle of Atlanta on July 22 and subsequently died of his wounds on July 28. He had been given a promotion to brigadier general on July 26, but did not live to receive it.

Command of the brigade fell to General William F. Brantley, and the regiment moved into Tennessee during the Franklin-Nashville Campaign, where they suffered further losses during the Confederate defeats at Franklin and Nashville. After spending the winter in Mississippi, during the spring of 1865 the regiment joined the Carolinas Campaign. In the final weeks of the war the 34th was consolidated with the 24th, 27th, and 29th Mississippi regiments. This consolidated unit surrendered with General Joseph E. Johnston's forces in North Carolina on April 26, 1865.

== Commanders ==
Commanders of the 34th Mississippi Infantry:

- Col. Samuel Benton, died of wounds received at Atlanta, July 1864.
- Lt. Col. Daniel B. Wright, disabled at Perryville and taken prisoner.

== Organization ==
Companies of the 34th Mississippi Infantry:

- Company A, "Tippah Rangers", of Tippah County.
- Company B, "Tippah Rebels", of Tippah County.
- Company C, "Smith Rifles", of Lafayette County.
- Company D, "Mississippi Avengers (Wynne Reliefs)"
- Company E, "Coldwater Rebels", of Marshall County.
- Company F, "Goodman Guards", of Marshall County.
- Company G, "Sons of Liberty", of Tippah County.
- Company H, "Tippah Farmers", of Tippah County.
- Company I, "Bowen Rebels", of Marshall County.
- Company K, "Dixie Guards", of Tippah County.

== See also ==
- List of Mississippi Civil War Confederate units
