= 52nd Tennessee Infantry Regiment =

- Active: January, 1862 - May 2, 1865
- Country: Confederate States Of America
- Allegiance: Confederate States Army
- Type: Infantry
- Engagements: Battle of Shiloh; Battle of Chickamauga

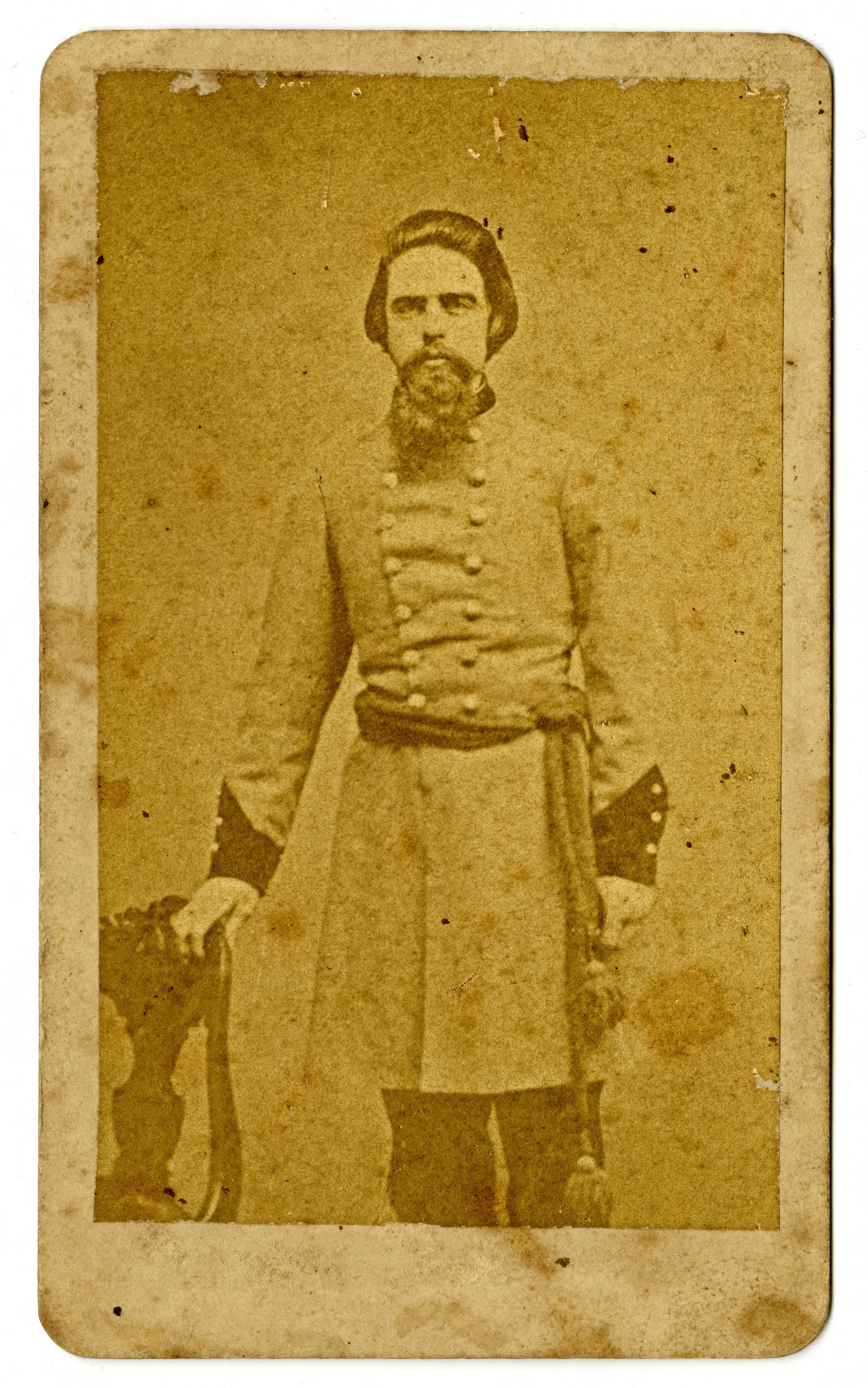
Lt. Col.John W. Estes

The 52nd Regiment, Tennessee Infantry was an infantry regiment from Tennessee that served with the Confederate States Army in the American Civil War. Notable battles that the regiment has engaged in include Shiloh and Chickamauga.

== Organization ==
This regiment was organized at Henderson Station, Tennessee, on January 1, 1862, with the men recruited from the counties of Decatur, Shelby, Weakley, and Henderson.

== Service ==
In early 1862, Maj. Gen. Leonidas Polk directed the 51st and 52nd Tennessee Infantry regiments to move to Danville upon receiving armaments. The units were marching to Fort Henry when it fell, and were instead ordered to Columbus, Kentucky. However, due to severe weather and a measles outbreak, the regiments were forced to return to their camp at Henderson Station

By February 26, while the regiment was at Henderson Station, Colonel Lea reported that the regiment had 760 men, but 260 of them were sick, and that the regiment was only equipped with 100 shotguns. On March 5, General Braxton Bragg transferred the 51st and 52nd to move to Corinth. Four days later, on March 9, they were assigned to both these regiments and attached to Walker's Brigade of Ruggles' Division. On April 3, Bragg ordered the 51st and 52nd Tennessee, alongside other Confederate units, to perform garrison and post duty at Corinth.

From April 6-7, 1862, the regiment took part in the Battle of Shiloh, where it was attached to Chalmer's Brigade of Wither's Division. Wither reported that the regiment broke and was routed, and despite several attempts to rally the regiments, only two companies stayed and fought alongside the 5th Mississippi. The regiment would go into battle with 400 men, but about 300 of them didn't take part in the battle.

After the battle, the 52nd was consolidated alongside the 51st, forming the 51st Consolidated Tennessee Regiment. However, The Confederate War Department declared that the consolidation was illegal in April 1863, and both regiments were reorganized as separate regiments, but the two regiments would consolidate again.

== Commanders ==
- Colonel Benjamin J. Lea
- Lieutenant Colonel John W. Estes
- Major Thomas G. Rundle
- Adjutant John R. Pegles

== See also ==
- List of Tennessee Confederate Civil War units
