= 30th Mississippi Infantry Regiment =

19th century confederate infantry unit from Mississippi

- Active: 1862–1865
- Country: Confederate States
- Allegiance: Mississippi
- Branch: Confederate States Army
- Type: Infantry
- Size: Regiment
- Battles: American Civil War: Siege of Corinth; Battle of Perryville; Battle of Stones River; Battle of Chickamauga; Battle of Lookout Mountain; Atlanta Campaign; Battle of Franklin; Battle of Nashville; Carolinas Campaign

The 30th Mississippi Infantry Regiment was a unit of the Confederate States Army in the American Civil War. Composed of volunteer companies from the central region of the state, the 30th Mississippi fought in many major battles of the Western theater before surrendering in April, 1865.

== History ==
The 30th Mississippi Infantry was organized in April 1862 at Grenada, Mississippi. The first action of the new regiment was defending a strategic railway junction in North Mississippi during the Siege of Corinth. The Confederates abandoned the town on May 29, 1862, and retreated. The regiment then took part in General Braxton Bragg's movement into Kentucky, fighting at the Battle of Perryville in October. Later reassigned to Edward C. Walthall's brigade, in Tennessee the regiment fought at the Battle of Stones River at the close of the year. The 30th Mississippi was heavily engaged in this battle, in one attack on the Union gun batteries the regiment lost 63 dead and 146 wounded.

In 1863 the regiment was moved to Georgia, taking part in the Battle of Chickamauga in September. Once again, the regiment came under severe fire, with commanding officer Colonel Junius Scales and several men of the regiment captured by Union forces. Command of the 30th Mississippi passed to Lieutenant-Colonel Hugh Reynolds, who died shortly afterward during an attack on the Union lines. In total, the regiment suffered 124 casualties at Chickamauga. Command then passed to Major James M. Johnson, who had also been wounded in that battle. The regiment fought at the Battle of Lookout Mountain in November, where 149 men were wounded, killed, and captured. James M. Johnson was subsequently promoted to Lieutenant Colonel and the regiment retreated into Georgia for the winter.

In 1864, the 30th was sent to defend the city of Atlanta. During the Atlanta Campaign, the regiment was consolidated with the 29th Mississippi and commanded by General William F. Brantley. At the Battle of Resaca on May 15, the regiment came under heavy attack, with General Brantley reporting, "the artillery firing during the day was the heaviest I have known during the war". Lieutenant Colonel Johnson was wounded, along with 28 others from the regiment, and 10 men were killed. The regiment fought at the subsequent battles at Cassville, New Hope Church, Kennesaw Mountain, and Jonesborough, taking further casualties.

In the Franklin-Nashville Campaign, the regiment took part in the bloody assault on the federal lines at the Battle of Franklin. Lieutenant Colonel Johnson was wounded again, and Company E of the regiment was wiped out. After a further Confederate defeat at the Battle of Nashville, the remains of the regiment retreated to Mississippi.

In the spring of 1865 the regiment was sent east to take part in the Carolinas Campaign. At this stage, Brantley's brigade had only 283 men left, representing only a fraction of normal regiment's strength. The different units of the brigade were consolidated as the 24th Mississippi Infantry Regiment, and the remaining Confederate forces in North Carolina then surrendered on April 26, 1865.

== Commanders ==
Commanders of the 30th Mississippi Infantry:

- Col. G.F. Neill, resigned 1863.
- Col. Junius I. Scales, captured at Chickamauga, 1863.
- Lt. Col. Hugh A. Reynolds, killed at Chickamauga, 1863.
- Lt. Col. James M. Johnson, wounded at Chickamauga, 1863, Resaca, 1864, and Franklin, 1864.

== Organization ==
Companies of the 30th Mississippi Infantry:

- Company A, "Neill Guards" of Carroll County.
- Company B, "True Mississippians"
- Company C, "Choctaw Planters"
- Company D, "Dixie Heroes" of Attala County.
- Company E, "Yazoo Greys" of Yazoo County.
- Company F
- Company G
- Company H, "Carroll Minute Men" of Carrollton.
- Company I, "Buckner Rebels"
- Company K, "Dixie Boys" of Carroll County

== See also ==
- List of Mississippi Civil War Confederate units
