= 29th Mississippi Infantry Regiment =

19th century confederate infantry unit from Mississippi

- Active: 1862–1865
- Country: Confederate States
- Allegiance: Mississippi
- Branch: Confederate States Army
- Type: Infantry
- Size: Regiment
- Battles: American Civil War: Siege of Corinth; Battle of Munfordville; Battle of Stones River; Battle of Chickamauga; Battle of Lookout Mountain; Atlanta Campaign; Battle of Franklin; Battle of Nashville

Commanders
- Notable commanders: Edward C. Walthall; William F. Brantley; James B. Morgan

The 29th Mississippi Infantry Regiment was a unit of the Confederate States Army in the American Civil War. The Regiment fought in many major battles of the Western theater, taking severe casualties before surrendering in April 1865 in North Carolina.

== History ==
The 29th Mississippi Infantry was organized at Grenada in April, 1862. The commanding officers, Edward C. Walthall and William F. Bradley had both previously served in the 15th Mississippi. Assigned to the infantry brigade of General James R. Chalmers, the first major action of the new regiment was at the Siege of Corinth in May, 1862, where Union forces took control of a strategic railroad junction from the defending Confederates.

The regiment joined the Confederate Heartland Offensive into Kentucky in the fall of 1862, fighting at the Battle of Munfordville in September, losing 5 killed and 36 wounded there. In recognition of his service at Munfordville, commander of the regiment Colonel Edward Walthall was promoted and given command of a brigade including the 29th that fought at the Battle of Stones River in Tennessee at the close of the year. During this battle the regiment was heavily engaged, charging federal fortifications and losing 34 killed and 202 wounded.

At the start of 1863, the 29th was moved to Georgia and temporarily consolidated with the 24th Mississippi. The 29th took major losses at the Battle of Chickamauga in September, suffering 194 casualties from a total strength of 368 men. Commanding officer Lieutenant Colonel James B. Morgan was severely wounded in this battle. In the subsequent Chattanooga campaign, the regiment fought at the Battle of Lookout Mountain, where the Confederate lines held by Walthall's brigade were overrun by Union troops. A number of men from the regiment were captured before Colonel William F. Brantley of the 29th could regroup the Mississippi brigade. In the subsequent Atlanta Campaign, Walthall was promoted to command a division and Brantley took command of the brigade. The 29th fought as a consolidated unit with the 30th Mississippi at Resaca, Cassville, and Jonesboro before the Confederates were overwhelmed and retreated from Atlanta.

During the Franklin-Nashville Campaign the 29th took part in intense combat at the Battle of Franklin, where commanding officer Major G.W. Reynolds was killed. Following further defeats including the Battle of Nashville in December, the brigade retreated into north Mississippi for the winter. In February 1865, the 29th Mississippi was sent to join the Carolinas Campaign. At this late stage of the war, Brantley's brigade, including the 29th Mississippi was thinned by losses to less than regimental strength, and the 29th was consolidated with the 24th, 27th, and 34th Mississippi Regiments. The Confederate forces in North Carolina then surrendered on April 26, 1865.

== Commanders ==
Commanders of the 29th Mississippi Infantry:

- Col. Edward C. Walthall, promoted to Brigadier General, 1862. Later served as a US Senator.
- Col. William F. Brantley, promoted to Brigadier General, 1864.
- Lt. Col. James B. Morgan, wounded at Chickamauga, 1863. Later served in the Mississippi State Senate.
- Major G.W. Reynolds, killed at Franklin, 1864.

== Organization ==
Companies of the 29th Mississippi Infantry:

- Company A, "Lafayette Rebels" of Lafayette County.
- Company B, "Robson Rifles"
- Company C, "Panola Patriots" of Panola County.
- Company D, "Fishing Creek Avengers" of Yalobusha County.
- Company E, "Oakland Rebels" of Yalobusha County.
- Company F, "Hampton Guards"
- Company G, "Walthall Rebels"
- Company H, "Gale Reserves" of Yazoo County.
- Company I, "De Soto Brothers" of De Soto County.
- Company K, "Dixie Rifles"

== See also ==
- List of Mississippi Civil War Confederate units
