= 23rd Tennessee Infantry Regiment =

The 23rd Regiment, Tennessee Infantry was an infantry regiment from Tennessee that served with the Confederate States Army in the American Civil War. Notable battles fought in include the Battle of Shiloh and the Battle of Chickamauga.

== Service ==
The regiment was organized in Camp Trousdale, Tennessee, consisting of 10 companies, which were recruited from the counties of Maury, Smith, Lawrence, De Kalb, Bedford, Rutherford, Marshall, Perry, Cannon, and Coffee.

The regiment surrendered on April 9, 1865, with 4 officers and 52 men remaining

== See also ==
- List of Tennessee Confederate Civil War units
