= 15th Mississippi Infantry Regiment =

- Active: 1861-1865
- Country: Confederate States of America
- Allegiance: Mississippi
- Branch: Confederate States Army
- Type: Infantry
- Size: Regiment
- Battles: American Civil War: Battle of Camp Wildcat; Battle of Mill Springs; Battle of Shiloh; Second Battle of Corinth; Jackson Expedition; Atlanta campaign; Battle of Franklin; Carolinas campaign

Commanders
- Notable commanders: Edward C. Walthall

The 15th Mississippi Infantry Regiment was a unit of the Confederate States Army from Mississippi. Composed of volunteer companies from North Mississippi, the 15th Regiment fought in many battles of the Western theater of the American Civil War before surrendering in April, 1865, in North Carolina.

== History ==
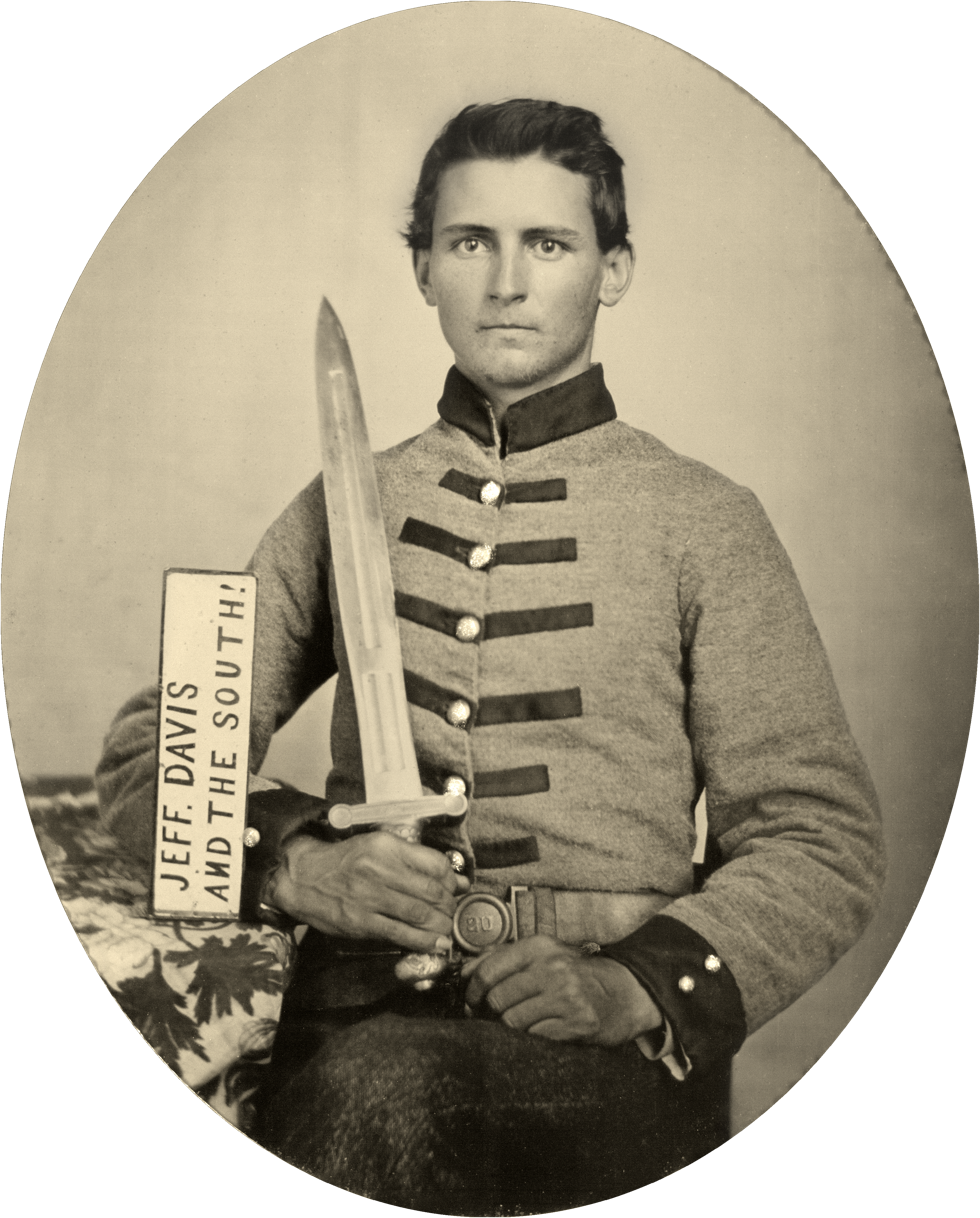
Private Henry Augustus Moore of Co. F, 15th Mississippi Infantry Regiment, with artillery short sword and sign reading "Jeff. Davis and the South!"

The companies of the 15th Mississippi assembled at Corinth in the spring of 1861, and were mustered into Confederate service in early June. The regiment was sent to Kentucky and joined the forces of General Felix Zollicoffer, fighting in the Battle of Camp Wildcat in October. The 15th fought in the Battle of Mill Springs in January, 1862, where General Zollicoffer was killed and the Regiment suffered heavy casualties, with 44 killed and 153 wounded. Following the battle, General George B. Crittenden reported: "The reputation of the Mississippians for heroism was fully sustained by this regiment. Its loss in killed and wounded, which was far greater than that of any other regiment, tells sufficiently the story of discipline and courage."

Following Zollicoffer's death, Col. Walter S. Statham of the 15th was assigned command of Zollicoffer's brigade. The Regiment fought at Shiloh as part of General John C. Breckinridge's reserve corps, and then was reorganized in May, 1862. The men re-enlisted for 2 years, command of the regiment passed to Michael Farrell, and Lt. Col. Edward C. Walthall left the 15th to organize the 29th Mississippi Infantry. Statham's brigade, including the 15th, was posted to Vicksburg, Mississippi to guard the city against advances by Federal gunboats. During the Battle of Baton Rouge, the 15th was held in reserve, but did not take part in the fighting. In October 1862, the 15th fought in Brig. Gen. John S. Bowen's brigade at the Second Battle of Corinth.

During the later stages of the Vicksburg Campaign, the 15th joined General Joseph E. Johnston's army, fighting at Jackson against Union General William T. Sherman's troops.

In 1864, the 15th Mississippi was sent to Georgia to take part in the Atlanta campaign, fighting at various points along the city's defensive lines, including the Battle of Resaca and Battle of New Hope Church. During the subsequent Franklin-Nashville Campaign, the regiment fought at the Battle of Franklin on November 30. The regiment's flag was lost at Franklin, with 4 flag-bearers shot down during the battle. Col. Michael Farrell, commander of the 15th Regiment, was mortally wounded at Franklin, and command passed to James Binford. Having suffered heavy losses in Tennessee, the regiment retreated to Mississippi. In the spring of 1865, the regiment was sent to take part in the Carolinas campaign, fighting at the Battle of Kinston and the Battle of Bentonville. During the final days of the war, the 15th was consolidated with the 6th, 20th, and 23rd Mississippi regiments into a combined unit designated as the 15th. This unit surrendered on April 26 at Durham, North Carolina.

== Commanders ==
Commanders of the 15th Mississippi Infantry:

- Col. Walter S. Statham
- Col. Michael Farrell, killed at Franklin, 1864.
- Lt. Col. J.W. Hemphill
- Lt. Col. Edward C. Walthall, later a US Senator from Mississippi (1895–1894, 1895–1898)
- Lt. Col. James Binford

== Organization ==
Companies of the 15th Mississippi Infantry:

- Company A, "Long Creek Rifles" of Attala County.
- Company B, "Winona Stars" of Carroll County.
- Company C, "Quitman Rifles" of Holmes County.
- Company D, "Wigfall Rifles" of Choctaw County.
- Company E, "McClung Rifles" of Carroll County.
- Company F, "Water Valley Rifle Guards" of Yalobusha County.
- Company G, "Grenada Rifles" of Yalobusha County.
- Company H, "Yalobusha Rifles" of Yalobusha County.
- Company I, "Choctaw Guards" of Choctaw County.
- Company K, "Oktibbeha Plough Boys" of Oktibbeha County (disbanded due to high rates of illness, 1861).
- Company K, "Choctaw Greys" of Choctaw County.

== See also ==
- List of Mississippi Civil War Confederate units
