= 19th Alabama Infantry Regiment =

Infantry regiment of the Confederate States Army

- Flag of Alabama in 1861 (obverse and reverse)
- Active: August 14, 1861 – April 1865
- Country: Confederate States of America
- Branch: Confederate States Army
- Role: Infantry
- Engagements: American Civil War: Battle of Shiloh; Battle of Stones River; Battle of Chickamauga; Battle of Missionary Ridge; Battle of Resaca; Battle of Atlanta; Battle of Franklin; Battle of Nashville

The 19th Alabama Infantry Regiment was an infantry regiment that served in the Confederate States Army during the American Civil War.

== Service ==
The 19th Alabama Infantry Regiment was formed in Huntsville, Alabama, on August 14, 1861. The unit fought its first battle at the Battle of Shiloh on April 6 and 7, 1862. The Army of Tennessee fought most of its battles with the 19th engaged. The regiment surrendered at Salisbury, North Carolina, at the end of the war.

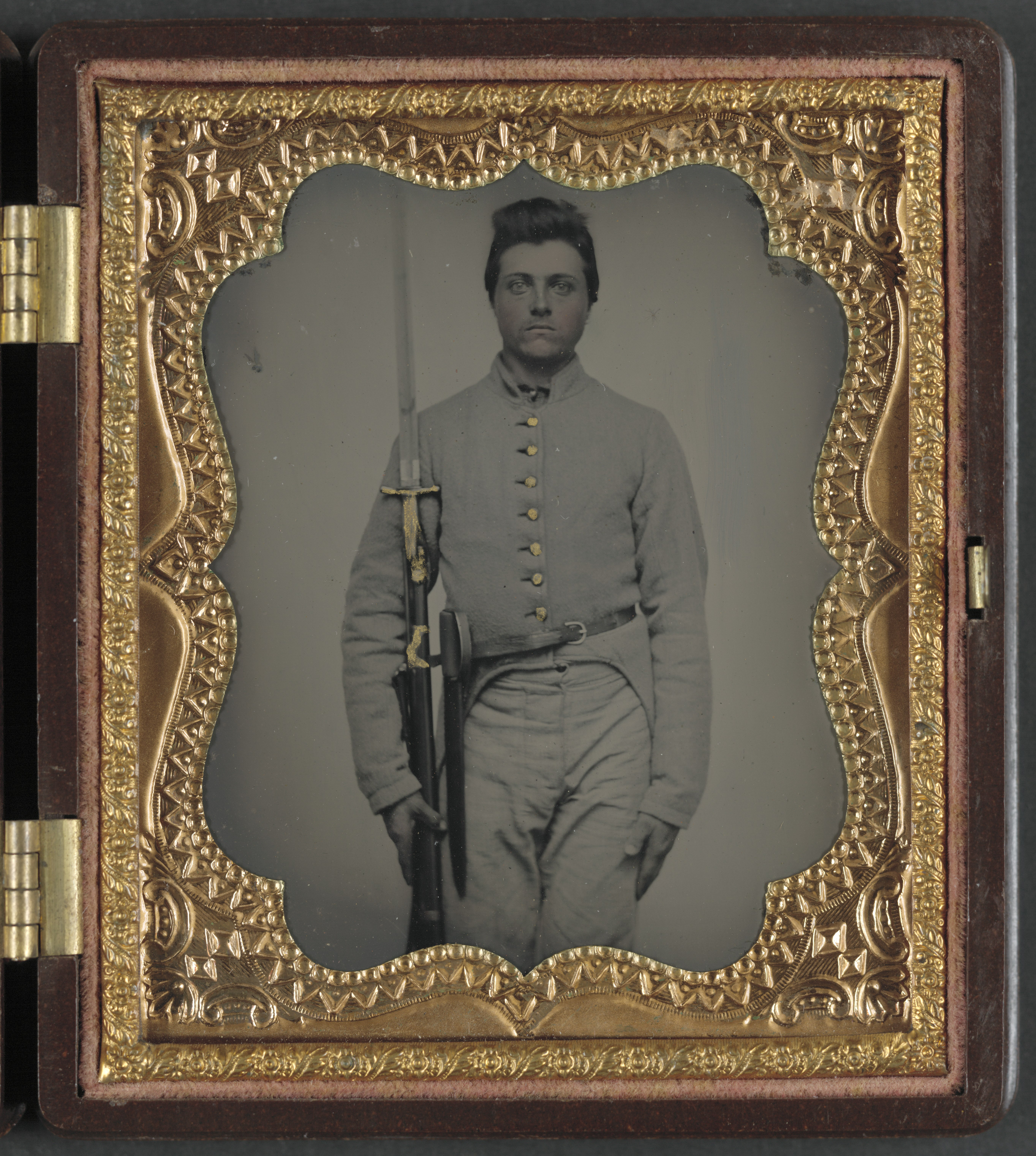
Private Parris P. Casey of Company I, "Cherokee Rangers," 19th Alabama Infantry Regiment, with bayoneted musket. From the Liljenquist Family Collection of Civil War Photographs in the Library of Congress

== Commanders ==
- Colonel Joseph Wheeler
- Colonel Samuel King McSpadden

== See also ==
- List of Confederate units from Alabama
