= Edward C. Walthall =

American politician (1831–1898)

Edward Cary Walthall
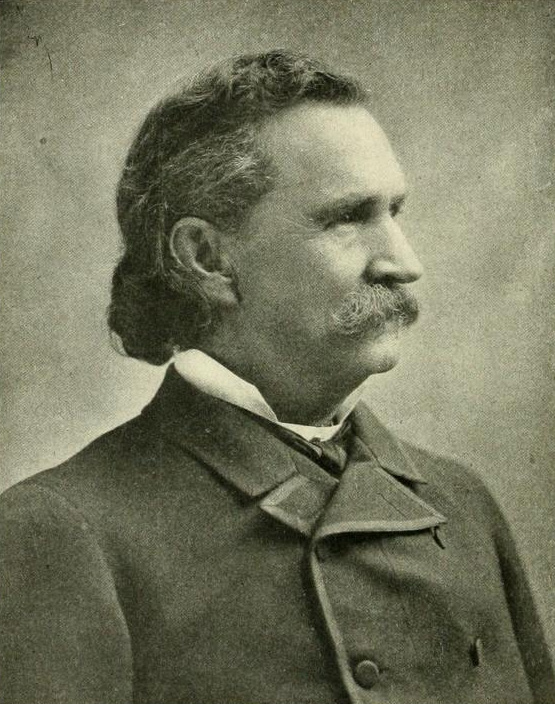

United States Senator from Mississippi
- In office March 9, 1885 – January 24, 1894
- Preceded by: Lucius Q. C. Lamar
- Succeeded by: Anselm J. McLaurin
- In office March 4, 1895 – April 21, 1898
- Preceded by: Anselm J. McLaurin
- Succeeded by: William V. Sullivan

Personal details
- Born: April 4, 1831 Richmond, Virginia, U.S.
- Died: April 21, 1898 (aged 67) Washington, D.C., U.S.
- Resting place: Hillcrest Cemetery; Holly Springs, Mississippi, U.S.
- Party: Democratic

Military service
- Allegiance: (Confederate States of America) Confederate
- Branch/service: Confederate States Army
- Years of service: 1861–1865
- Rank: Major General
- Unit: 15th Mississippi Infantry
- Commands: Walthall's Division—III Corps; Walthall's Brigade; 29th Mississippi Infantry
- Battles/wars: American Civil War; Battle of Mill Springs; Siege of Corinth; Confederate Heartland Offensive; Tullahoma Campaign; Battle of Chickamauga; Chattanooga campaign; Battle of Resaca; Battle of Franklin; Battle of Nashville; Carolinas campaign

Edward Cary Walthall (April 4, 1831 – April 21, 1898) was a general in the Confederate States Army during the American Civil War and a Reconstruction era United States senator from Mississippi.

== Early life ==
Edward C. Walthall was born in Richmond, Virginia, on April 4, 1831. Walthall moved to Mississippi with his family in 1841. He attended St. Thomas Hall in Holly Springs, studying law. He was admitted to the bar in 1852. Then, he practiced law in Coffeeville. He was elected district attorney for the tenth judicial district of Mississippi in 1856 and reelected in 1859.

== American Civil War ==
During the Civil War, Walthall entered the Confederate Army as a lieutenant in the 15th Mississippi Infantry on April 27, 1861, and was promoted to lieutenant colonel on July 21, 1861. He fought with his regiment at the Battle of Mill Springs on January 19, 1862. Walthall was elected colonel of the 29th Mississippi Infantry Regiment on April 11, 1862, and fought at the Siege of Corinth and in the Confederate Heartland Offensive. Commanding one of the Army of Tennessee's brigades during November 1862 he was appointed brigadier general on December 13, 1862.

Walthall led his brigade in the Tullahoma Campaign and fought at the Battle of Chickamauga on September 19–20, 1863. Walthall distinguished himself at the Battle of Missionary Ridge, where he led his brigade over a ridge and held back the Federal troops until the Confederate army made its escape; however he was wounded in the foot and captured on November 25, 1863; but quickly was exchanged. He was wounded again at the Battle of Resaca on May 15, 1864.

Afterwards he advanced to division command in Lieutenant General Alexander P. Stewart's corps, receiving a temporary promotion to major general on June 6, 1864.

At the Battle of Franklin on November 30, 1864, Walthall was wounded (at least badly bruised) as he had two horses shot from under him, but he quickly returned to duty.

Walthall covered the retreat of General Hood's army after the defeat at Nashville. While Lieutenant General Alexander P. Stewart was in command of the remnant of the Army of Tennessee which was under the overall command of General Joseph E. Johnston during the Carolinas campaign, Walthall acted as III corps commander of the Army of Tennessee from March 16, 1865, until April 9, 1865, when he returned to division command in that corps. He and his division surrendered with General Joseph E. Johnston at Bennett Place on April 26, 1865. He was paroled at Greensboro, North Carolina, on May 1, 1865.

== Post-war ==
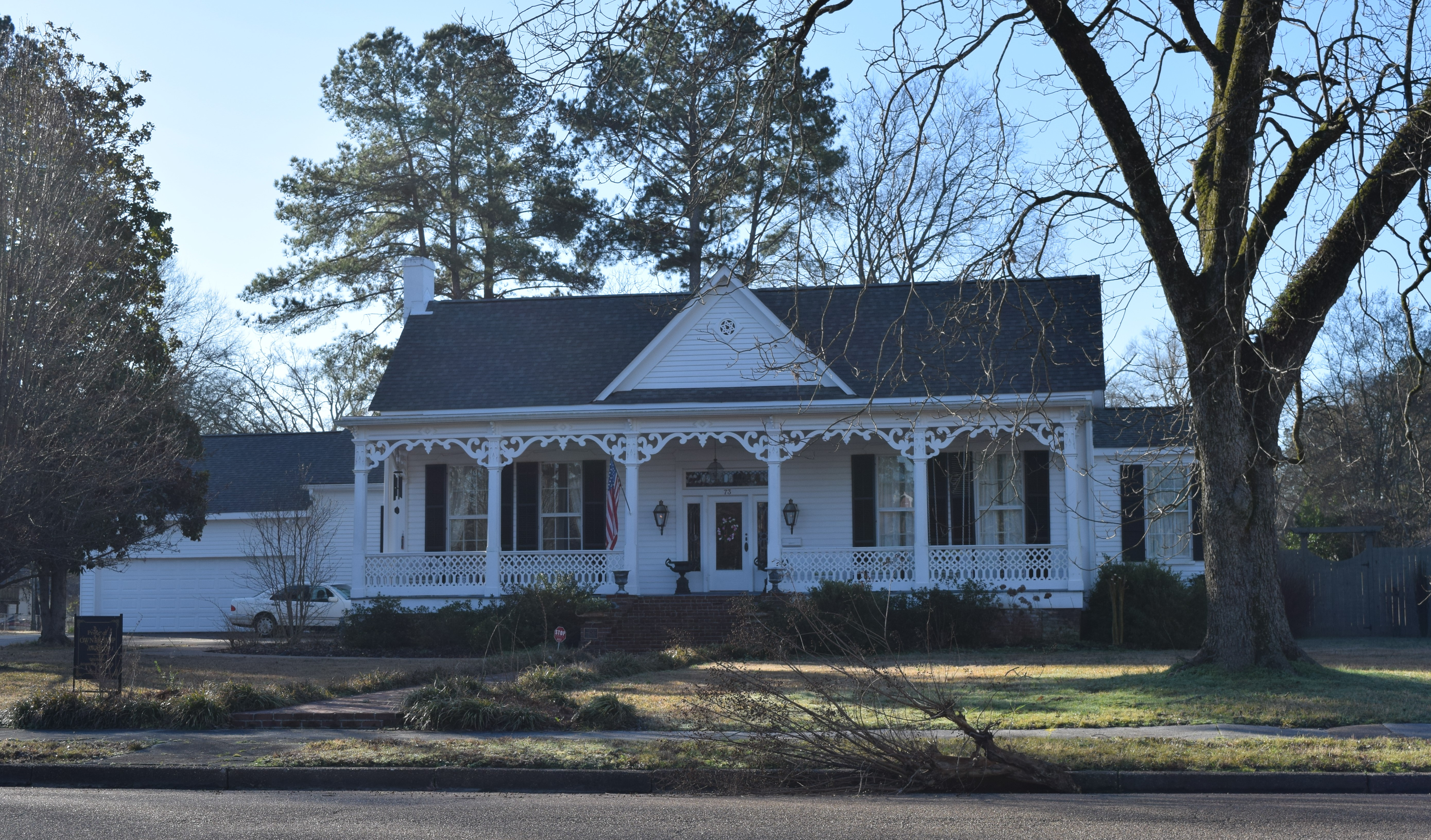
Edward C. Walthall House in Grenada, Mississippi in 2019

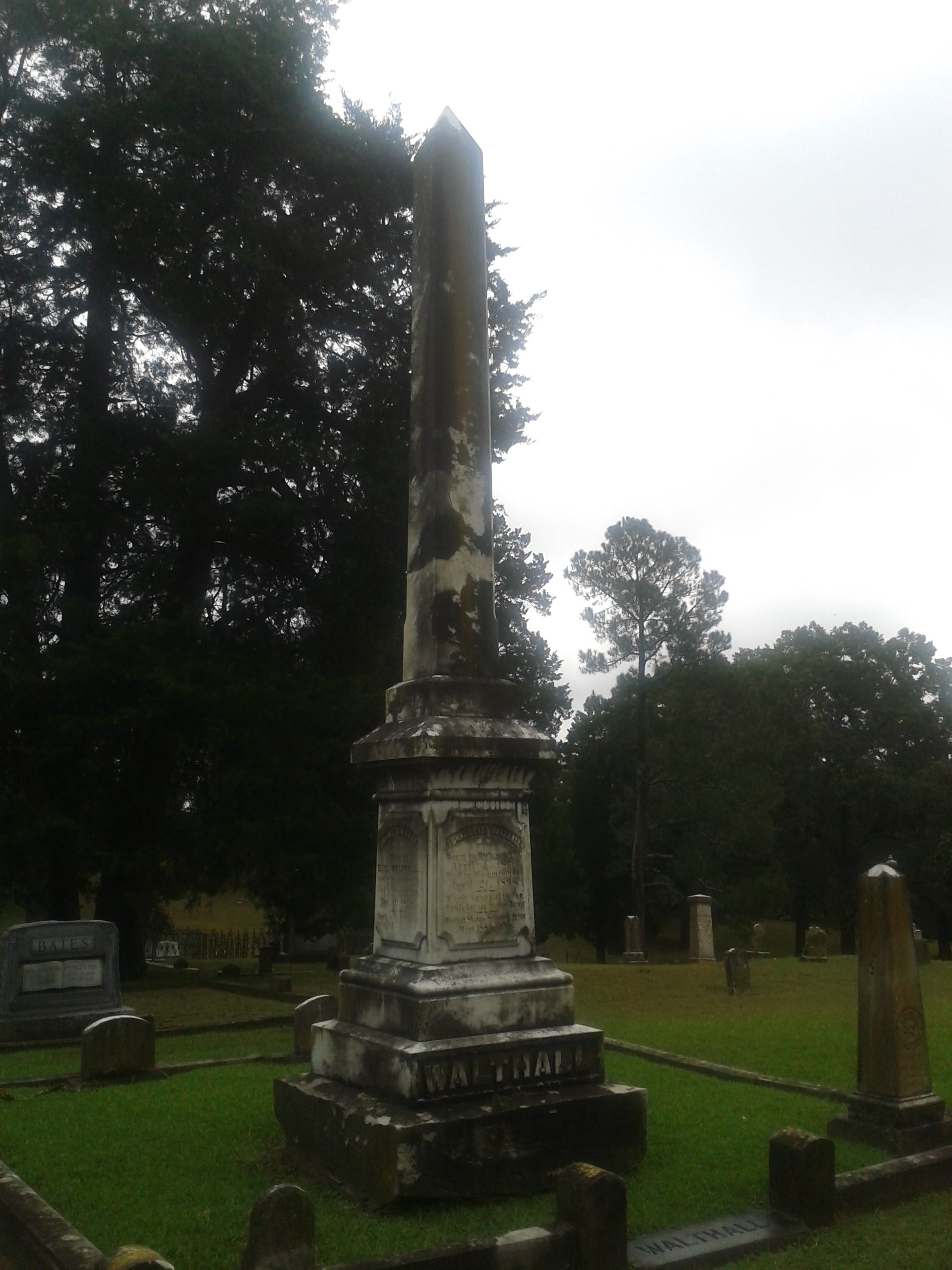
Walthall's grave in Holly Springs

After the war, Walthall resumed the practice of law in Coffeeville. In 1871, he moved to Grenada, Mississippi, and continued practicing law until 1885.

Walthall was appointed as a Democrat to the U.S. Senate to fill the vacancy caused by the resignation of Lucius Q. C. Lamar. He was subsequently elected to fill the vacancy, and was reelected in 1889. He served from March 9, 1885, to January 24, 1894, when he resigned due to ill health. While in the Senate, he was chairman of the Committee on Military Affairs (Fifty-third Congress) and a member of the Committee on Revolutionary Claims (Fifty-fifth Congress).

Walthall was again elected for the term beginning March 4, 1895, and served from that date until his death in Washington, D.C., on April 21, 1898. Funeral services were held in the Chamber of the United States Senate. He was buried at the Hillcrest Cemetery in Holly Springs, Mississippi.

== Legacy ==
Walthall County, Mississippi, is named after him.

== See also ==
- List of American Civil War generals (Confederate)
- List of members of the United States Congress who died in office (1790–1899)

== Notes ==
U.S. Senate
Preceded by Lucius Q. C. Lamar	U.S. senator (Class 2) from Mississippi; 1885–1894; Served alongside: James Z. George	Succeeded by Anselm J. McLaurin
Preceded by Anselm J. McLaurin	U.S. senator (Class 2) from Mississippi; 1895–1898; Served alongside: James Z. George, Hernando D. Money	Succeeded by William V. Sullivan
