= 24th and 25th Consolidated Texas Cavalry Regiment =

24th Texas Cavalry Regiment 2nd Texas Lancers 25th Texas Cavalry Regiment 3rd Texas Lancers
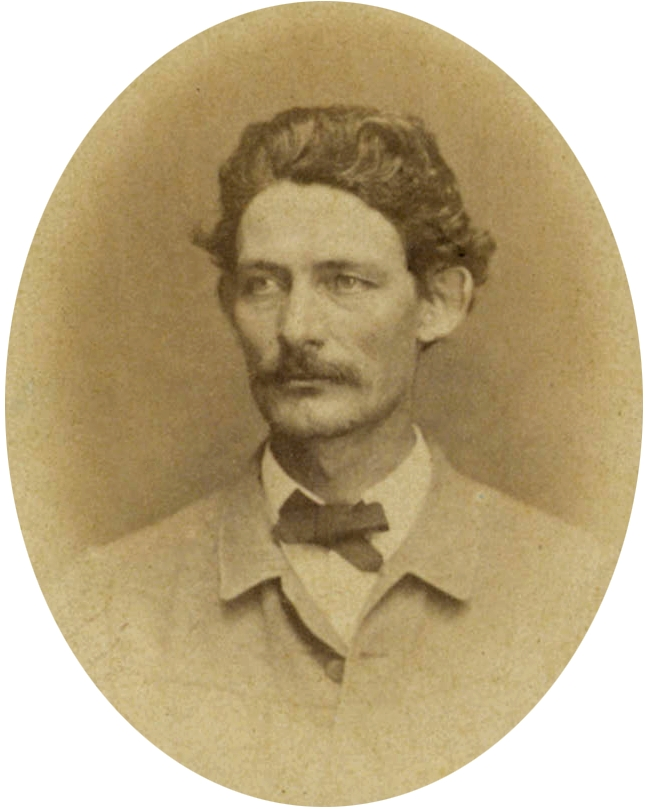
- The 24th-25th Texas Cavalry fought in Hiram B. Granbury's Texas brigade in 1864.
- Active: 16 April 1862 – 26 April 1865
- Country: Confederate States of America
- Allegiance: Confederate States of America, Texas
- Branch: Confederate States Army
- Type: Cavalry and Infantry
- Size: Regiment
- Nicknames: 2nd Lancers, 3rd Lancers
- Engagements: American Civil War; Battle of Arkansas Post (1863); Battle of Liberty Gap (1863); Battle of Chickamauga (1863); Battle of Missionary Ridge (1863); Battle of Ringgold Gap (1863); Atlanta campaign (1864); Battle of Franklin (1864); Battle of Nashville (1864); Battle of Bentonville (1865)

Commanders
- Notable commanders: Franklin C. Wilkes; Clayton C. Gillespie

The 24th and 25th Consolidated Texas Cavalry Regiment was a unit that originally consisted of two regiments of mounted volunteers that served in the Confederate States Army during the American Civil War. However, by the time the two regiments were consolidated, they fought as infantry. Both regiments organized as cavalry near Hempstead, Texas in April 1862 and were dismounted to fight as infantry in July 1862. The two regiments served in the same brigade and were captured at the Battle of Arkansas Post in January 1863. After being sent to Northern prison camps, the soldiers were exchanged in April 1863. Assigned to the Army of Tennessee, the two regiments were consolidated with two additional Texas cavalry regiments and in 1863 fought as infantry at Liberty Gap, Chickamauga, Missionary Ridge, and Ringgold Gap. In 1864, the other two Texas regiments were detached and the consolidated 24th and 25th fought as a separate infantry unit in the Atlanta campaign, at Franklin, and at Nashville. For the Carolinas campaign, the 24th and 25th fought at Bentonville before being reconsolidated with other Texas regiments and surrendering in April 1865.

== Formation ==
In the spring of 1862, George Washington Carter received permission from the Confederate States Army to form a regiment of Texas lancer cavalry. The recruitment effort was well-publicized and many Texans preferred to serve in the cavalry rather than the infantry. The number of recruits was so large that three regiments were formed, the 1st, 2nd, and 3rd Lancers. These became the 21st Texas Cavalry, 24th Texas Cavalry, and 25th Texas Cavalry Regiments, respectively. Carter became the colonel of the 21st Texas Cavalry.

Franklin Collet Wilkes was appointed colonel commanding the 24th Texas Cavalry. Robert Reese Neyland became lieutenant colonel, and Patrick H. Swearingen and William A. Taylor became majors. The regiment was organized at Camp Carter near Hempstead, Texas on April 16, 1862, and about 900 soldiers were enrolled in the regiment by mid-September 1862. The 24th Texas Cavalry recruited men from the counties listed in the table below, plus others from Brazos, Fayette, Karnes, Live Oak, McCulloch, Milam, and Nueces Counties. There were also recruits from what later became Waller County, but was part of Austin County until 1873.

Recruitment Areas of the 24th Texas Cavalry Regiment
Company	Main Recruitment Area
A	Tyler County
B	Montgomery County
C	Comanche County
D	Washington County
E	Jasper County
F	Fort Bend County
G	various
H	San Saba County
I	Lavaca County
K	DeWitt County

The 25th Texas Cavalry was organized at Camp Carter on April 24, 1862, and recruited men from the counties listed in the table below, plus others from Angelina, Hardin, Hunt, Rusk, and Trinity Counties. James A. Hathcock stated that the 25th Texas Cavalry formed eight companies named A through H. However, James A. Williams' list included 10 companies A through K (J was always omitted). Williams did not list any specific recruitment area for Company B. He listed Smith's company from Fayette County which may be Company B, or it may be a separate company. About 900 soldiers were enrolled in the regiment by mid-September 1862. The field officers were Colonel Clayton Crawford Gillespie, Lieutenant Colonel William Madison Neyland, Major Joseph N. Dark, and Major Edward Bradford Pickett.

Recruitment Areas of the 25th Texas Cavalry Regiment
Company	Main Recruitment Area
A	Tyler County
Smith's (B?)	Fayette County
C	Jasper County
D	Goliad County
E	Brazos County
F	Tyler County
G	Liberty County
H	Liberty County
I	Liberty County
K	Walker County

== History ==
=== 1862–1863 ===
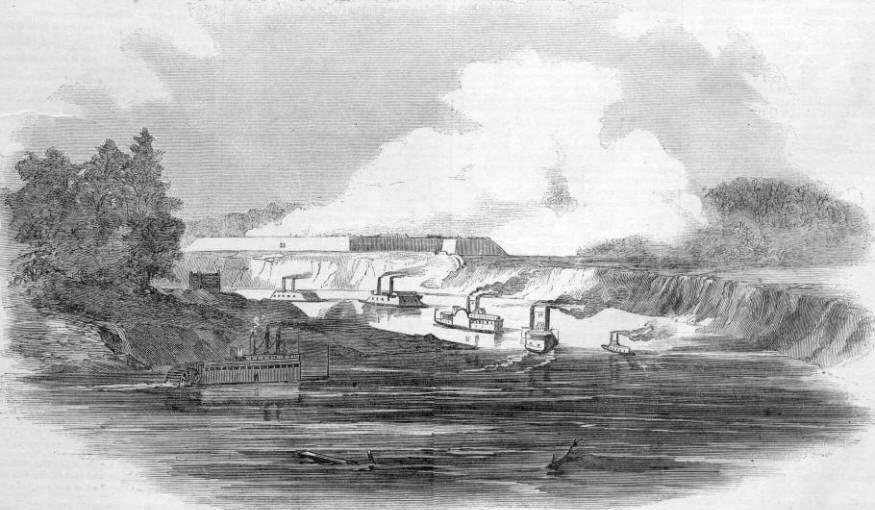
Union gunboats are shown attacking Fort Hindman at Arkansas Post.

Because so many Texans volunteered to serve in cavalry units, there were not enough infantry units to defend Arkansas. Therefore, on July 28, 1862, Major General Thomas C. Hindman ordered that the 24th Texas Cavalry Regiment be dismounted to serve as infantry at El Dorado, and the order was reiterated on September 1 while the regiment was stationed at Camp Holmes near Pine Bluff. The 25th Texas Cavalry was dismounted at about the same time. The 24th and 25th Texas Cavalry were both assigned to Colonel Robert R. Garland's infantry brigade. Confederate cavalrymen were supposed to provide their own horses and the order to dismount was very unpopular, with many soldiers threatening to desert or writing home about how they were mistreated. Hindman's heavy-handed efforts resulted in a respectable number of Confederate troops being made available to defend Arkansas, but it also resulted in Hindman's replacement as department commander by Lieutenant General Theophilus H. Holmes on July 26, 1862.

Garland's brigade was assigned to defend Arkansas Post under the overall command of Brigadier General Thomas J. Churchill. Garland's brigade consisted of the 6th Texas Infantry Regiment, the 24th and 25th Texas Cavalry Regiments (dismounted), and Hart's Arkansas Battery. At Arkansas Post, the 24th Texas Cavalry numbered 587 officers and men, while the 25th Texas Cavalry counted 552. Arkansas Post was located on the Arkansas River about 50 mi (80 km) upstream from its confluence with the Mississippi River. The Confederates repulsed a Union attempt to capture Vicksburg, Mississippi at the Battle of Chickasaw Bayou in late December 1862. Major General John Alexander McClernand soon assumed command of the Union army and determined to capture Arkansas Post. With 13 gunboats and 50 transports, Rear Admiral David Dixon Porter's flotilla steamed up the Arkansas River and landed McClernand's 30,000 troops on January 9, 1863. As the Federal forces began surrounding Arkansas Post and Fort Hindman on January 10, Churchill received orders to hold at all costs. On January 11, a combined assault by the Union fleet and army forced the Confederate defenders to surrender in the Battle of Arkansas Post. Union casualties numbered 1,061 but they captured 4,791 Confederates.

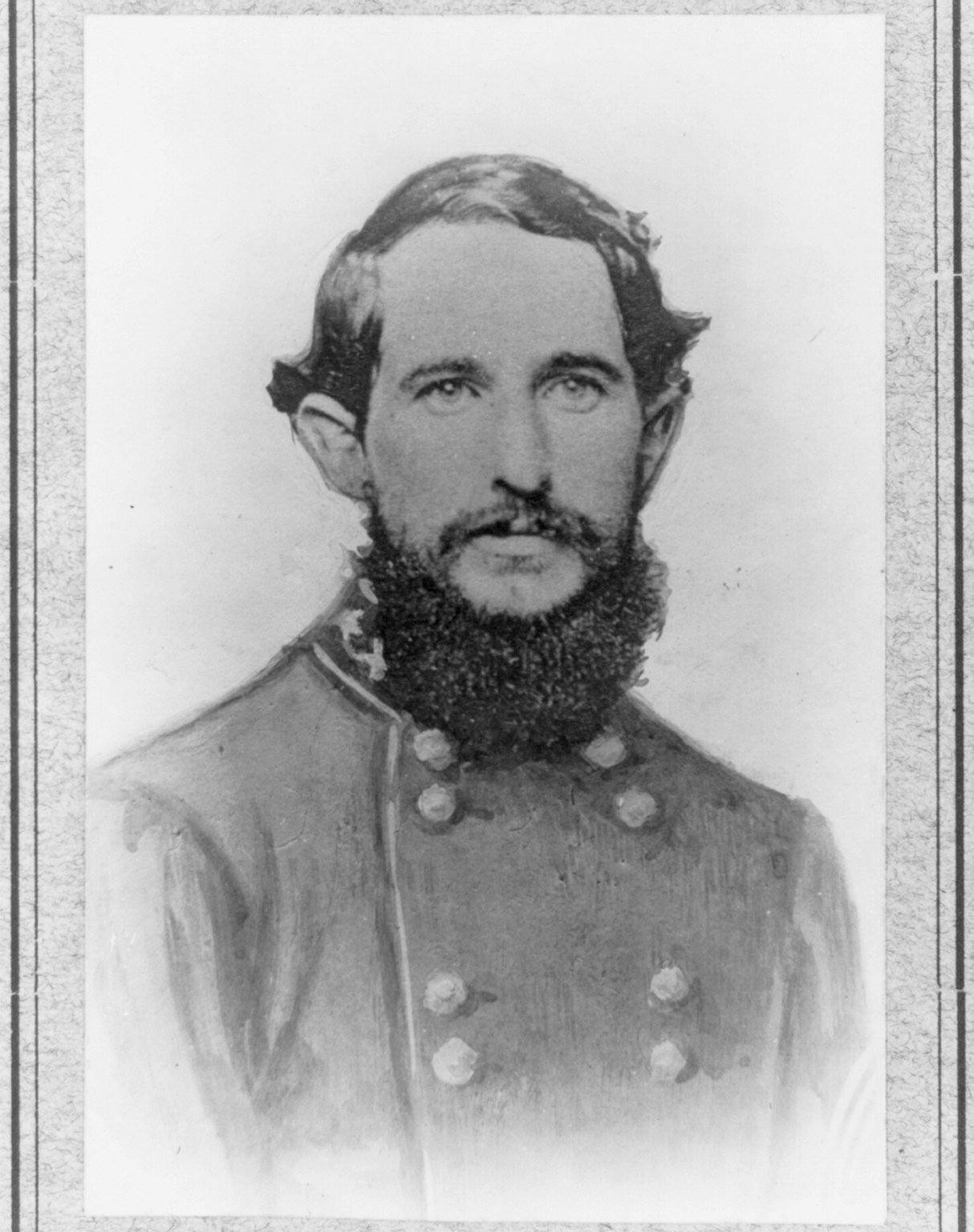
James Deshler

At Arkansas Post, the 24th Texas Cavalry suffered 54 casualties. The prisoners from the 24th Texas Cavalry were sent north to Camp Butler, near Springfield, Illinois. Most of the prisoners from the 25th Texas were sent to Camp Douglas near Chicago. Many men died while in the prison camps before the men were sent to Petersburg, Virginia where they were released in a prisoner exchange in April 1863. When the 24th and 25th Regiments joined the Army of Tennessee at Wartrace, Tennessee, they consolidated with the dismounted 17th Texas and 18th Texas Cavalry Regiments. The consolidated 17th-18th-24th-25th Texas Cavalry Regiment fought at the Battle of Liberty Gap during the Tullahoma campaign.

At the Battle of Chickamauga on September 19–20, 1863, the 17th-18th-24th-25th Texas was assigned to Brigadier General James Deshler's brigade in Major General Patrick Cleburne's division. The other units in the brigade were the 19th and 24th Consolidated Arkansas Infantry Regiment and the consolidated 6th-10th-15th Consolidated Texas Regiment. Colonel Wilkes was wounded in the fighting and replaced by Lieutenant Colonel John T. Colt, then Major W. A. Taylor. The brigade lost 52 killed and 366 wounded. On the first day, Cleburne's division launched an attack near the Winfrey Field at 6:00 pm, only 10 minutes before sunset. Deshler's brigade lost track of the rest of the division, moving too far to the left. In the dark forest, Deshler's skirmish line blundered into a Federal brigade and the men were nearly all captured. However, in the darkness and confusion, some of the skirmishers escaped and one of Deshler's units helped capture some Union soldiers. On the second day, Deshler's brigade attacked Union soldiers that were protected by breastworks. Like the previous brigade that attacked, when they reached the crest of a rise, Deshler's men were stopped by murderous fire that inflicted severe casualties and the soldiers went to ground. Cleburne ordered Deshler to hold on as long as possible while the other brigade fell back to reform. As Deshler was moving along the line, he was hit by a shell and killed; he was replaced in command by Colonel Roger Q. Mills. Soon afterward, a soldier from the 24th Texas reported to Mills that Wilkes was wounded in the right leg by shrapnel. For two and a half hours, the brigade held its position, while suffering severe losses. Finally, Mills pulled the brigade back out of the line of fire while the crest was manned only by sharpshooters. The 17th-18th-24th-25th Texas suffered 200 casualties during the ordeal. One soldier from the 24th Texas Cavalry stated that his company numbered 63 men but only 28 were left after the battle.

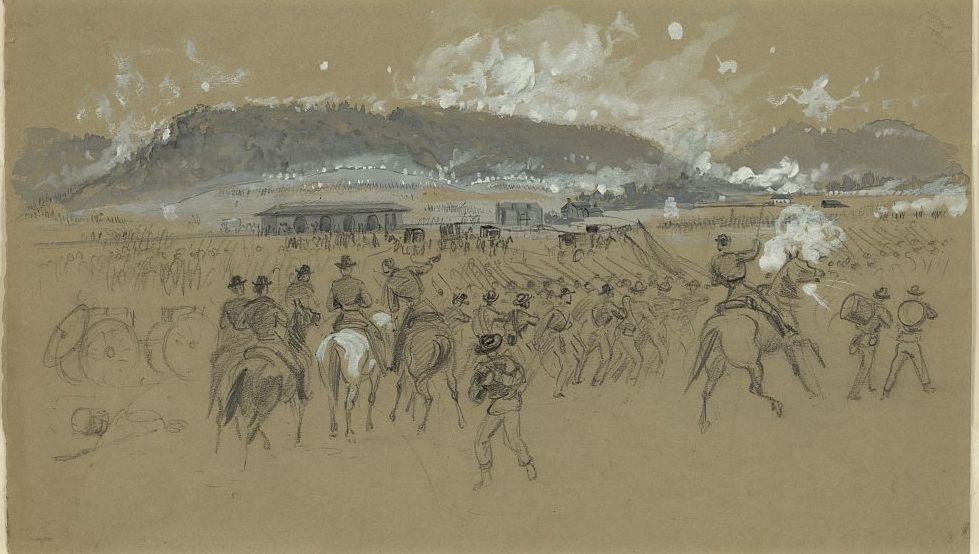
Battle of Ringgold Gap as viewed from the Federal perspective.

On November 24, 1863, Major General William Tecumseh Sherman's Union forces crossed the Tennessee River east of Chattanooga and threatened the Confederate defenses on Missionary Ridge. The Confederate high command only belatedly responded by ordering Cleburne's division to hold the north end of the ridge. Cleburne posted his leading brigade under Brigadier General James Argyle Smith on Tunnel Hill, with Brigadier General Mark Perrin Lowrey's brigade to its left and Colonel Daniel Govan's brigade to its right. Since it was late in the afternoon, Sherman mistakenly decided not to press the attack. At the Battle of Missionary Ridge, Smith's brigade consisted of the 7th Texas, the 6th-10th-15th Texas, and the 17th-18th-24th-25th Texas Regiments, the last under Major W. A. Taylor. By the morning of November 25, Cleburne's division was reinforced by more Confederate units. The first attack by Sherman's soldiers occurred at 10:30 am and was repulsed. However, both Smith and Mills were badly wounded and Colonel Hiram B. Granbury assumed command of the brigade. The 6th-10th-15th Texas held the left, the 7th Texas was in the center, and the 17th-18th-24th-25th Texas was posted on the right. At 11:30 am, the Union soldiers made a second attack. This time, the Federals killed or wounded all the officers and sergeants in a supporting Confederate battery and the fighting was desperate. Captain Samuel Foster of the 24th Texas Cavalry recorded, "This was business. We could see what we were doing. When we killed a man, we knew it. We saw him fall." The Texans counterattacked, sending the Union troops fleeing downhill, but Foster was hit in the leg and carried to the rear. A third Federal attack was made, but at 4 pm, a Confederate counterattack cleared the Union soldiers from the slopes of Tunnel Hill.

At the Battle of Ringgold Gap on November 27, 1863, Cleburne's division was the Confederate rearguard, trying to cover the withdrawal of the army's wagon train. Granbury's brigade was assigned to defend 350 ft (107 m) high White Oak Mountain, to the north of the gap. The 6th-10th-15th and the 17th-18th-24th-25th Texas were concealed at the bottom of the ridge while the 7th Texas was at the top, in reserve. At 8 am, Granbury's men were attacked by three Missouri regiments from Charles R. Woods' brigade of the XV Corps. Two Union regiments were stopped cold, but the third regiment tried to turn the right flank of the 17th-18th-24th-25th Texas. Anticipating the move, Major Taylor launched a counterattack which routed all three Federal regiments. Later, when two more Union regiments moved past his right flank, Taylor reported the situation to Granbury. In response, regiments from the brigades of Lowrey and Brigadier General Lucius E. Polk drove off the Union soldiers. In December 1863, the 17th-18th-24th-25th Texas counted 690 men.

=== 1864–1865 ===
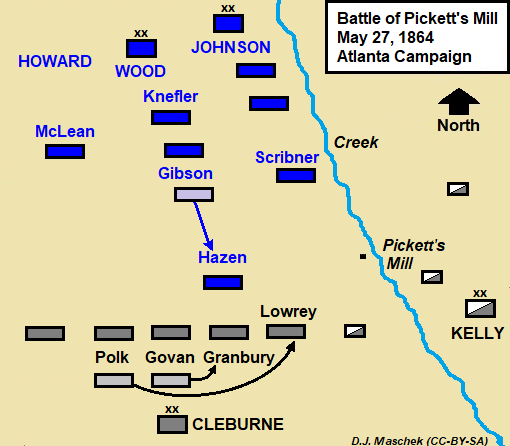
Battle of Pickett's Mill map shows Hazen's initial assault and Cleburne's reaction.

Granbury's brigade was reorganized before fighting in the Atlanta campaign. The 24th-25th Consolidated Texas Cavalry Regiment led by Colonel Wilkes was separated from the 17th-18th Texas Cavalry, but the two units served in the same brigade. The other units in the brigade were the 6th-15th Texas, 7th Texas Infantry, and 10th Texas Infantry. Other leaders of the 24th-25th Texas Cavalry were Lieutenant-Colonel Neyland and Major Taylor during the campaign. On February 26, 1864, Granbury's brigade drove off a Union mounted regiment that had seized Dug Gap. On May 8, Granbury's brigade was sent back to Dug Gap where it repulsed a Union attack during the Battle of Rocky Face Ridge. The next major action of Granbury's brigade was at the Battle of Pickett's Mill where it repulsed the attack of a Union division. The Federals aimed for a section of the Confederate line that was guarded only by cavalrymen. However, Granbury's men arrived just in time to plug the gap. Cleburne's division sustained 448 casualties, mostly among Granbury's Texans, but their foes lost 1,400. Captain Foster, recovered from his wound, was on picket duty the next morning when he found himself surrounded by dead Federals, many of whom were shot in the head. Though he had seen many dead and wounded soldiers in the war, the gruesome sight made Foster feel faint and he had to leave.

At the Battle of Gilgal Church on June 15, 1864, Foster and the 24th Texas Cavalry and Captain Richard Goldthwaite's Alabama battery repulsed a Union attack. Before the Federal troops approached their position, Foster related that they tore down the church until it was level to the ground. On July 21, J. A. Smith led the Texas brigade when Granbury was on sick leave. Smith reported that he never saw such accurate Union artillery fire. An exploding shell narrowly missed Foster, throwing him into the air and killing three soldiers nearby. The following day, during the Battle of Atlanta, the brigades of Govan and Smith assaulted the Union flank and drove back an Iowa brigade. Govan's brigade lost too many men to go on, but Smith's Texans continued the charge against Bald Hill, a key position. A Union counterattack drove back the Texans, wounding Smith and nearly wiping out the 17th-18th Texas. The Confederates, including elements of the Texas brigade, made a final effort to seize Bald Hill late in the day, but failed to take it.

On August 31, 1864, at the Battle of Jonesborough, the Texas brigade under Granbury was ordered to attack an entrenched Federal position. Midway through their charge, the soldiers came under flanking fire from a force of dismounted Union cavalry. Instead of continuing their planned assault, the brigade veered to the left and drove the Union cavalry across the shallow Flint River. Since the rest of Cleburne's division followed Granbury's brigade, the attack miscarried. When the division regrouped, it was determined that the Federal defenses were too strong to assault successfully. On September 1, Union attackers overran Govan's brigade, capturing its commander and most of its soldiers. Seeing the disaster, Granbury quickly pulled back the right flank of his brigade and, with the help of another brigade, plugged the hole in the line.

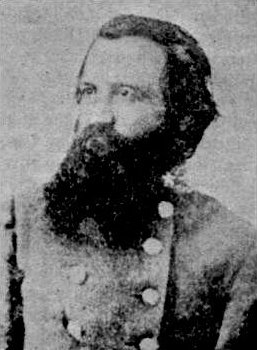
James A. Smith

Granbury's brigade fought in the Franklin–Nashville campaign. At the Battle of Spring Hill on November 29, 1864, Granbury's brigade drove off a Union regiment supported by a pair of cannons. Then, in the breakdown of the Confederate command communications that evening, the brigade was ordered to move in a different direction. At the Battle of Franklin on November 30, by an astonishing blunder, two brigades of Union troops were left in an advanced position to face the assault of 20,000 Confederates. When the Union troops were routed, men from the divisions of Cleburne and John C. Brown followed the fleeing Federals and punched a 200 yd (183 m) wide gap in the Union defenses. However, a reserve Union brigade and other reserve units spontaneously counterattacked and recovered a second line of entrenchments behind the first line in hand-to-hand fighting. For hours Confederate units kept trying to attack, but the advantage was with the Federal defenders. Union losses were 2,613 killed, wounded, and missing but Confederate losses were probably around 7,000. A few weeks later, the Federals counted 1,750 Confederate graves at Franklin and captured 3,800 Confederate wounded in the town's hospitals. Several Confederate generals were killed, including Cleburne and Granbury.

At the Battle of Nashville on December 15–16, 1864, Cleburne's division was commanded by J. A. Smith and Granbury's brigade was led by Captain E. T. Broughton. The brigade consisted of the 35th Tennessee, 6th-15th Texas, 7th Texas, 10th Texas, 17th-18th Texas, and 24th-25th Texas Infantry Regiments, Captain L. M. Nutt's Louisiana Cavalry Company, Goldthwaite's Alabama Battery, Key's Arkansas Battery, and Bledsoe's Missouri Battery. On December 13, Granbury's brigade was ordered to build a lunette north of the railroad tracks on the Confederate right flank. On December 15, the lunette, manned by about 300 men from Granbury's brigade repelled a Union attack. On December 16, Granbury's brigade was originally stationed on the extreme left flank. But, when the Federals attacked Overton Hill on the right flank, the brigades of Granbury and Lowrey were sent there as reinforcements.

The 24th-25th Texas Cavalry (dismounted) fought in the Carolinas campaign from February to April 1865, and at the Battle of Bentonville on March 19–21, 1865. On April 9, all the Texas regiments in Granbury's former brigade were consolidated into a single unit, the 1st Texas under Lieutenant Colonel W. A. Ryan. The 1st Texas and the consolidated Arkansas regiments (1st Arkansas) formed Govan's brigade in Brown's division. The 1st Texas surrendered on April 25 in North Carolina, but a remnant of the 25th Texas surrendered in the Trans-Mississippi Department on May 26, 1865. The fewer than 50 survivors from the 24th Texas surrendered on April 25 at Durham Station, North Carolina, but a fragment also surrendered in the Trans-Mississippi on May 26. Sergeant Z. M. Guynes remarked that only 4 men were left out of the original 110 men from Company B, 24th Texas Cavalry.

== See also ==
- List of Texas Civil War Confederate units
