= 7th Texas Infantry Regiment =

Infantry regiment of the Confederate States Army

- Active: 1861–1865
- Disbanded: May 1, 1865
- Country: Confederate States
- Allegiance: Texas
- Branch: Army
- Type: Infantry
- Size: Regiment
- Nickname: "Gregg's regiment"
- Facings: Light blue
- Equipment: Rifled musket
- Engagements: American Civil War; Battle of Fort Donelson (POW); Battle of Raymond; Battle of Jackson; Battle of Chickamauga; Battle of Missionary Ridge; Battle of Ringgold Gap; Atlanta campaign; Battle of Franklin; Battle of Nashville; Battle of Averasborough; Battle of Bentonville

Commanders
- Notable commanders: John Gregg; Hiram B. Granbury

The 7th Texas Infantry Regiment, also known as "Gregg's regiment", was an infantry formation of the Confederate States Army in the Western theater of the American Civil War.

The regiment was captured at Fort Donelson and sent to Northern prison camps. After the survivors were exchanged and new recruits added, the regiment was reconstituted and fought at Raymond, Jackson, Chickamauga, Missionary Ridge, and Ringgold Gap. It served in the Atlanta campaign and at Franklin, Nashville, Averasborough, and Bentonville. Surviving members of the regiment were paroled at Greensboro, North Carolina, on May 1, 1865.

== History ==
=== Formation ===
In 1861, John Gregg, a district judge from Fairfield, Texas was appointed colonel with authority to raise an infantry regiment. On 2 October 1861, nine companies were formed into a regiment at Marshall, Texas. The district attorney of Harrison County, Jeremiah M. Clough became lieutenant colonel and the chief justice of McLennan County, Hiram B. Granbury became major. The new regiment rode a train to Shreveport, Louisiana and marched from there to Memphis, Tennessee. It was mustered into the Confederate States Army on 10 November 1861 at Hopkinsville, Kentucky. Between that date and February 1862, 130 soldiers died of disease at camp.

=== 1862 ===
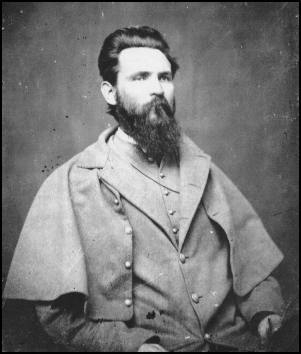
John Gregg, the regiment's first colonel.

On 9 February 1862, the 7th Texas marched to Clarksville, Tennessee and from there to Fort Donelson on 13 February. The 7th was the only one of the 28 Confederate infantry regiments in the garrison from Texas. The 7th Texas formed part of a brigade commanded by Colonel T. J. Davidson, which also included the 8th Kentucky Infantry, 1st Mississippi Infantry, and 3rd Mississippi Infantry. During the Battle of Fort Donelson on 15 February, the brigade sustained losses of 68 killed and 218 wounded. During the fighting, the 7th Texas lost 20 killed, including Clough, and 40 wounded. On 16 February, the garrison of Fort Donelson surrendered to Ulysses S. Grant's Union army. Some soldiers of the 7th Texas avoided capture and later joined Terry's Texas Rangers or the 9th Texas Infantry Regiment. Nevertheless, over 300 men from the regiment were shipped to Federal prison camps where 65 men died.

On 16 September 1862, the soldiers of the 7th Texas were exchanged at Vicksburg, Mississippi. There were so few remaining men that they were temporarily consolidated with the 49th and 55th Tennessee Infantry Regiments, which were also captured at Fort Donelson. Gregg received promotion to brigadier general, effective 29 August 1862, and Granbury replaced Gregg as colonel. William L. Moody, a businessman from Fairfield, became lieutenant colonel and Khleber M. Van Zandt, a lawyer from Marshall, became major.

=== 1863–1865 ===
In January and February 1863, so many recruits from Texas arrived that the 7th Texas resumed its individual identity. The regiment was assigned to Gregg's brigade and fought in the Battle of Raymond on 12 May 1863. Gregg's brigade consisted of the 7th Texas, 1st Tennessee Battalion, 3rd, 10th/30th (consolidated), 41st, and 50th Tennessee Regiments, and Hiram Bledsoe's Missouri Battery. At Raymond, the brigade suffered losses of 73 killed, 251 wounded, and 190 missing, or 514 total casualties. The Union forces sustained 442 casualties. At Raymond, Gregg with only one brigade unwittingly courted battle with an entire Union corps under James B. McPherson. The Federals deployed two brigades and advanced into the dense vegetation bordering Fourteen Mile Creek. Not realizing he was facing a corps, Gregg aggressively decided to attack frontally with the 7th Texas and 3rd Tennessee while sending the 10th/30th and 50th Tennessee to hit the Union right flank. The Texans attacked the 20th Ohio Infantry and the Federal unit only held its ground because its division commander John A. Logan personally rallied it. A second Union division arrived on the field and the 7th Texas faced three Federal regiments before being compelled to withdraw. The 7th Texas lost 22 killed, 66 wounded, and 70 captured out of a total strength of 305 men.

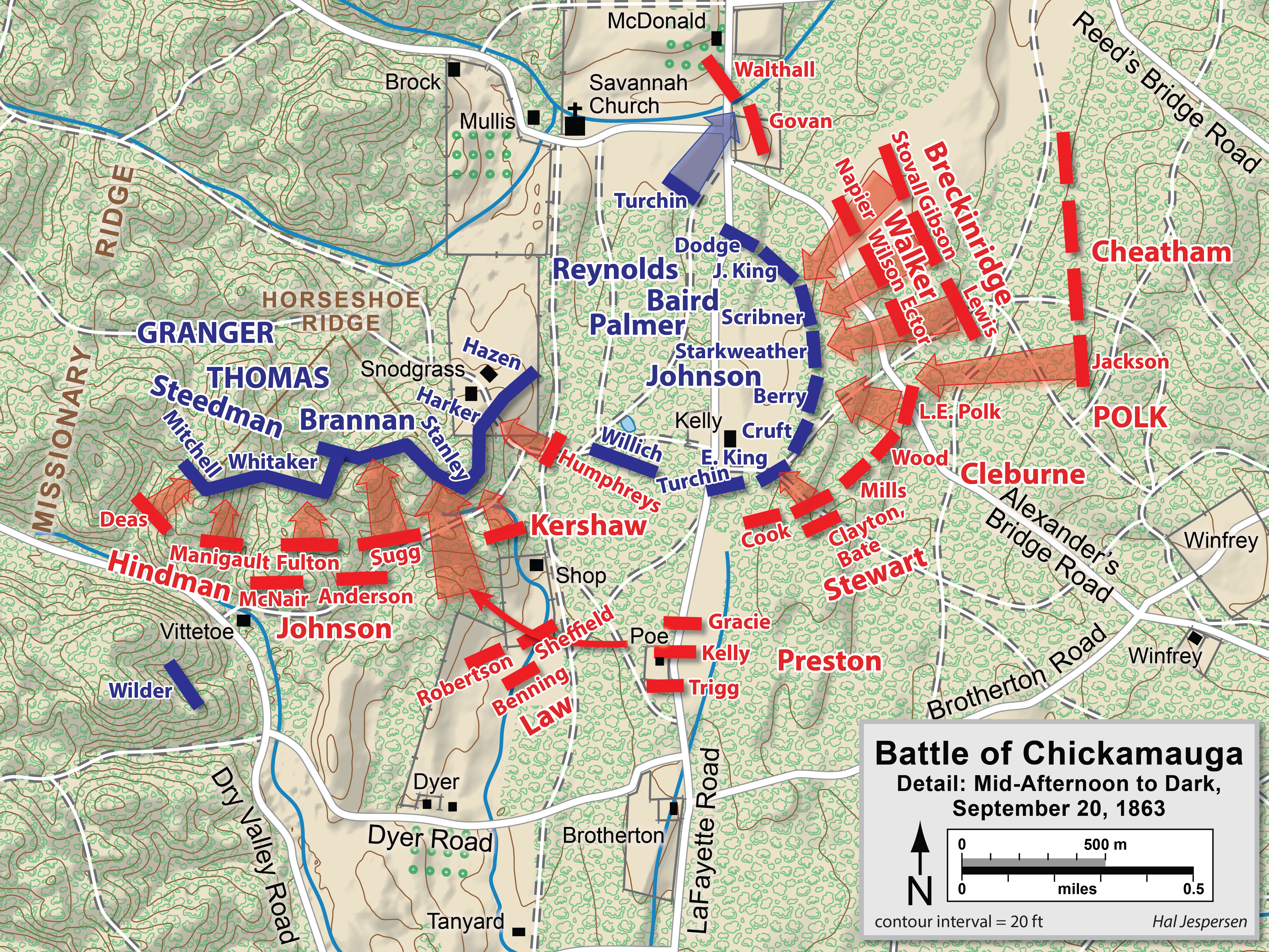
Sugg's brigade is shown attacking Horseshoe Ridge late on the second day of the Battle of Chickamauga.

Gregg's brigade fought in the Battle of Jackson, Mississippi on 14 May 1863. Moody was badly wounded in July near Jackson, Mississippi and never returned to the regiment. The 7th Texas fought at the Battle of Chickamauga on 19–20 September, losing eight killed, 78 wounded, and one captured out of 177 men. Gregg's brigade, which formed part of Bushrod Johnson's division, suffered 109 killed, 474 wounded, and 18 missing, a total of 601 casualties. On the first day, Gregg's brigade became involved in a see-saw musketry duel with Hans Christian Heg's Federal brigade. Later, as Gregg's regiments were moving through the forest, they bumped into Charles Garrison Harker's Union brigade. In heavy woods, Gregg inadvertently rode into a Federal skirmish line and was shot down. After the skirmishers took his sword and spurs, some men from the nearby Texas Brigade rescued the unconscious general. Cyrus Sugg took command of Gregg's brigade. On the second day, James Longstreet placed Johnson's division at the forefront of his heavy column of attack. The 7th Texas formed the left flank of Johnson's first line. By an astonishing blunder, the opposing Union troops marched away, leaving a hole in their line. Johnson's division advanced into the gap, beginning the rout of the Union right wing. Later, when Sugg's brigade was striking toward the Union rear at Horseshoe Ridge, James B. Steedman's Union division fortuitously appeared and repulsed the Confederate attacks.

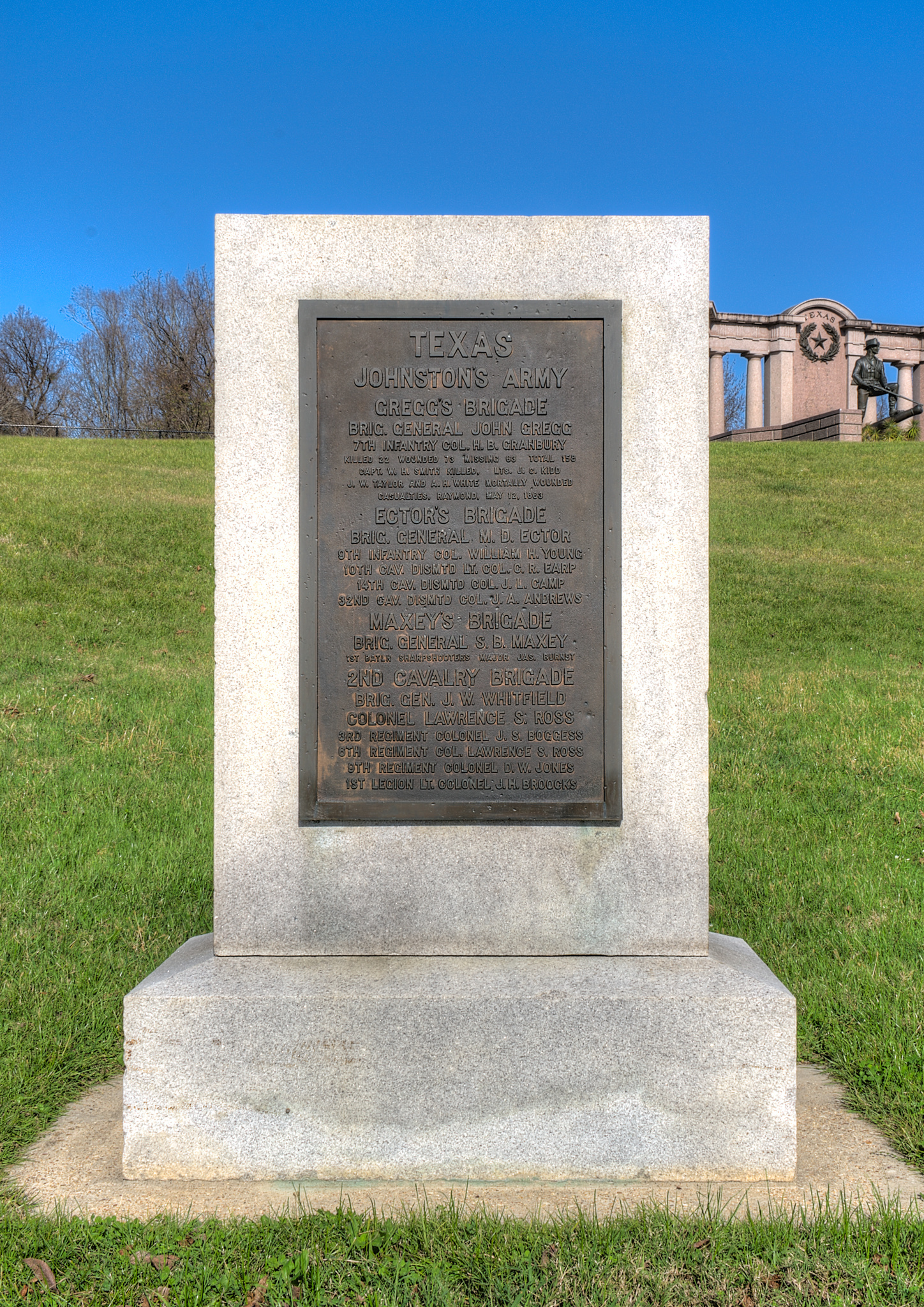
Historical Marker at Vicksburg National Military Park lists the 7th Texas Infantry at top.

Before the Battle of Missionary Ridge on 25 November 1863, there was a reorganization that assigned the 7th Texas to James Argyle Smith's brigade in Patrick Cleburne's division. The other units in Smith's brigade were the 6th-10th-15th Consolidated Texas Regiments and the 17th-18th-24th-25th Consolidated Texas Cavalry Regiments. All cavalry units were dismounted. Smith's brigade counted about 1,300 men and was deployed to defend Tunnel Hill at the northern end of Missionary Ridge. Beginning around 10:30 am, Smith's brigade and nearby units became the target of piecemeal Federal attacks. During an early counterattack, Smith was badly wounded and Granbury took command of the brigade. So many gunners from Swett's Mississippi Battery became casualties, that soldiers from the 7th Texas were detailed to man the guns. At 4:00 pm Cleburne ordered a counterattack which was highly successful. Led by Granbury's Texans, the Confederates charged, capturing numerous Union soldiers and sweeping the survivors off Tunnel Hill.

Granbury's Texas brigade fought at the Battle of Ringgold Gap on 27 November 1863. Cleburne's division took a strong position at the gap in order to slow Federal pursuit of the Confederate army. Cleburne posted Granbury's brigade on the right flank on a ridge. The Texans routed the first three Union regiments from Charles R. Woods's brigade that tried to attack. When another regiment threatened to outflank the 7th Texas on the brigade's right flank, Cleburne sent in the 1st Arkansas Infantry Regiment which drove back the Federal troops. After four hours of combat, Cleburne withdrew his division in good order and there was no pursuit. Granbury was soon promoted to brigadier general in command of the brigade. Throughout the Atlanta campaign in summer of 1864, Granbury's men were engaged in the Battle of Rocky Face Ridge, the Battle of Resaca, the Battle of Pickett's Mill, the Battle of Kennesaw Mountain, the Battle of Peachtree Creek, the Battle of Atlanta, and the Battle of Jonesborough. At different times during the campaign, the 7th Texas was commanded by Captains J. H. Collet, C. E. Talley, and J. W. Brown. The 7th Texas lost 17 killed, 76 wounded, and seven missing in the campaign. At the Battle of Jonesborough on 1 September 1864, a Federal corps overran Daniel Govan's Arkansas brigade, capturing its commander and half of its soldiers. However, Granbury's brigade was next in line and it stopped the Union attack.

At the Battle of Franklin on 30 November 1864, the 7th Texas lost 18 killed, 25 wounded, and 22 captured. Generals Cleburne and Granbury were both killed and the commanding officer of the 7th Texas, Captain Brown was captured. In the Battle of Nashville on 15–16 December, Granbury's former brigade, which now included the 35th Tennessee Infantry Regiment, was so reduced in officers and men that it was commanded by a captain and the 7th Texas was led by Captain O. P. Forrest. After the battle, at least 23 soldiers from the 7th Texas fell into Federal hands, many of whom lay wounded in hospitals. About one-fourth of the regiment was furloughed at this time.

The remnant of the 7th Texas served in the Campaign of the Carolinas in early 1865. The regiment was assigned to Govan's brigade in John C. Brown's division of William J. Hardee's corps. The 7th Texas was consolidated with the other Texas units from Granbury's old brigade and the unit was commanded by Lieutenant Colonel W. A. Ryan. The Texans were present at the Battle of Averasborough on 16 March 1865 and the Battle of Bentonville on 19–21 March. When Joseph E. Johnston surrendered to Sherman on 26 April 1865, the 7th Texas counted two surgeons, six officers and 57 men. The last known survivor of the 7th Texas was Charles W. Trice of Company A who died on 1 December 1936 at Lexington, North Carolina. Trice was wounded at the Battle of Kennesaw Mountain on 27 June 1864 and had an arm amputated.

== See also ==
- List of Texas Civil War Confederate units
