= 15th Texas Cavalry Regiment =

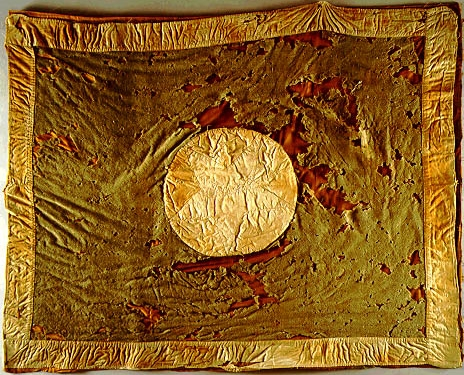
- Flag of the Consolidated 6th Texas Infantry and 15th Texas Dismounted Cavalry Regiment
- Active: 10 March 1862 – 26 April 1865
- Country: Confederate States of America
- Allegiance: Confederate States of America, Texas
- Branch: Confederate States Army
- Type: Cavalry, later dismounted as Infantry
- Size: Regiment
- Equipment: Rifled musket
- Engagements: American Civil War; Batesville Skirmish (1862); Battle of Arkansas Post (1863); Battle of Chickamauga (1863); Battle of Missionary Ridge (1863); Battle of Ringgold Gap (1863); Atlanta campaign (1864); Battle of Franklin (1864); Battle of Nashville (1864); Battle of Averasborough (1865); Battle of Bentonville (1865)

Commanders
- Notable commanders: George H. Sweet

The 15th Texas Cavalry Regiment was a unit of cavalry volunteers mustered into the Confederate States Army in March 1862 and fought during the American Civil War. In July 1862 the unit was dismounted and served the remainder of the war as infantry. The regiment was captured at Arkansas Post in January 1863. After being exchanged three months later, the much-reduced 15th Texas was consolidated with two other regiments and assigned to Patrick Cleburne's division in the Army of Tennessee. The consolidated regiment fought at Chickamauga, Missionary Ridge, and Ringgold Gap in 1863. After a re-consolidation, the regiment fought in the Atlanta campaign, and at Franklin and Nashville in 1864. After a final consolidation the troops fought at Averasborough and Bentonville in 1865. The regiment's 43 surviving soldiers surrendered to Federal forces on 26 April 1865.

== History ==
=== Formation ===
George H. Sweet briefly served as a private in the Texas Brigade in the Eastern Theater of the American Civil War. A newspaperman from San Antonio, Sweet obtained an officer's commission and authority to raise his own regiment before returning to Texas. Starting in January 1862, he had little trouble raising ten companies of soldiers. The volunteers equipped themselves with their own horses and gear. As they drilled on courthouse squares, the recruits presented a rather motley appearance. On 10 March 1862, the 15th Texas Cavalry Regiment was accepted into Confederate service at McKinney, Texas. One volunteer recalled that many of the soldiers were middle aged men and boys. By mid-September 1862, the regiment enrolled 1,000 soldiers with Sweet in command.

Approximate Company Organization of the 15th Texas Cavalry Regiment
Company	Recruitment Area
A	Bexar County
B	Wise County
C	Dallas County
D	Johnson County
E	Tarrant County
F	Limestone County
G	Denton County
H	Red River County
I	Van Zandt County
K	Johnson County

=== 1862–1863 ===
After the regiment moved into Arkansas, it became subject to the First Conscription Act and was reorganized on 20 May 1862. Due to the Act, about 100 soldiers were discharged for being too young or too old. The Act also specified that the soldiers could elect their own officers. Sweet was reelected colonel, George Bibb Pickett became lieutenant colonel, and William Henry Cathey became major. Soon afterward, Pickett of Wise County was sent home to Decatur, Texas to recruit. On 8 July 1862, the regiment was involved in a skirmish with Federal forces at Batesville, Arkansas in which eight men were killed and seven wounded. Sweet commended Captain Valerius P. Sanders of A Company for "coolness and bravery" under fire. A Union force under Samuel Ryan Curtis numbering 6,000 infantry, 3,000 cavalry, and 1,000 artillerymen occupied Batesville by 1 June. Hoping to cut off Curtis's troops from supplies, Thomas C. Hindman ordered Sweet's regiment to cross the White River above Batesville. Hindman claimed 200 Union troops were captured and a number of wagons were captured before Cadwallader C. Washburn's Union cavalry brigade compelled the Texans to retreat. Soon after, on 24 July, the regiment was dismounted and the men's horses sent home. The soldiers were never remounted and served through the rest of the war as infantry. Cathey resigned for health reasons on 21 October 1862 and was replaced as major by Sanders.

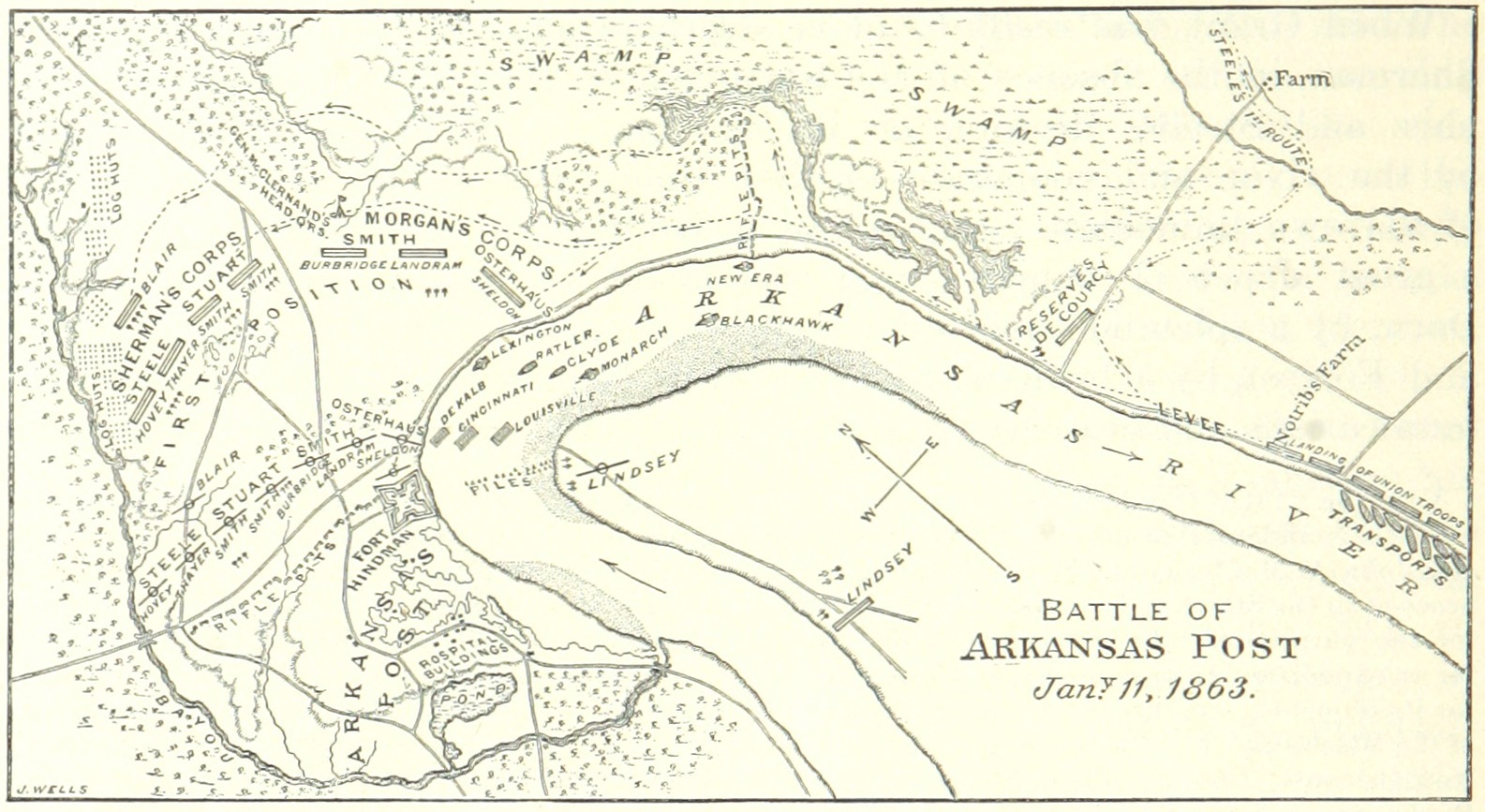
Map shows the Battle of Arkansas Post.

The 15th Texas Cavalry was ordered to garrison Arkansas Post in the late fall of 1862. The place proved to be a very unhealthy campsite and over 100 men from the regiment died from disease while others were sent home as unfit for duty. About this time, Colonel Sweet left the regiment on detached duty and ended the war as superintendent of Camp Ford, a prisoner-of-war camp. The 15th Texas Cavalry under Major Sanders was assigned to James Deshler's brigade along with the 10th Texas Infantry, and the 17th and 18th Texas Cavalry Regiments, fighting dismounted. In the Battle of Arkansas Post, 30,000 Federal troops led by John Alexander McClernand and 13 gunboats under David Dixon Porter attacked the 5,000 Confederate defenders under Thomas James Churchill. The Union expedition steamed up the Arkansas River in 50 transports and on 9 January 1863 landed the soldiers downstream from the post. The next day, the Federal troops began to envelop the Confederate defenses. That night Churchill received orders to hold Arkansas Post at all costs. On 11 January 1863, a joint land and naval assault silenced Fort Hindman's guns and overwhelmed the defenders, forcing 4,791 Confederates to surrender. Federal casualties numbered 1,061.

In the 15th Texas Cavalry 27 officers and 436 rank and file became prisoners of war. The regiment's number of killed and wounded is unknown, but Assistant Surgeon Nathan Wyncoope was fatally wounded during the fighting. The officers were sent to Camp Chase in Ohio, while the enlisted men traveled to Camp Douglas in Chicago. About 700 of the captured Texans died in only two months of captivity, including approximately 100 men from the 15th Texas Cavalry. The death toll was made worse because a number of the men caught pneumonia and other illnesses on the trip up the river and because few of the men had blankets. On 3 April 1863, the surviving rank and file were sent to City Point, Virginia for prisoner exchange and on 29 April the officers were sent to Fort Delaware. The ordeal of the enlisted men was worse than that of the officers. Many of the survivors were so ill that they subsequently died or were discharged sick. Because this resulted in a surplus of officers, about two-thirds of the officers were sent back to Texas. The remaining soldiers of the 15th Texas Cavalry were consolidated into a single regiment together with the 6th Texas and 10th Texas Infantry. Major Sanders stayed with the new formation.

=== 1863–1865 ===
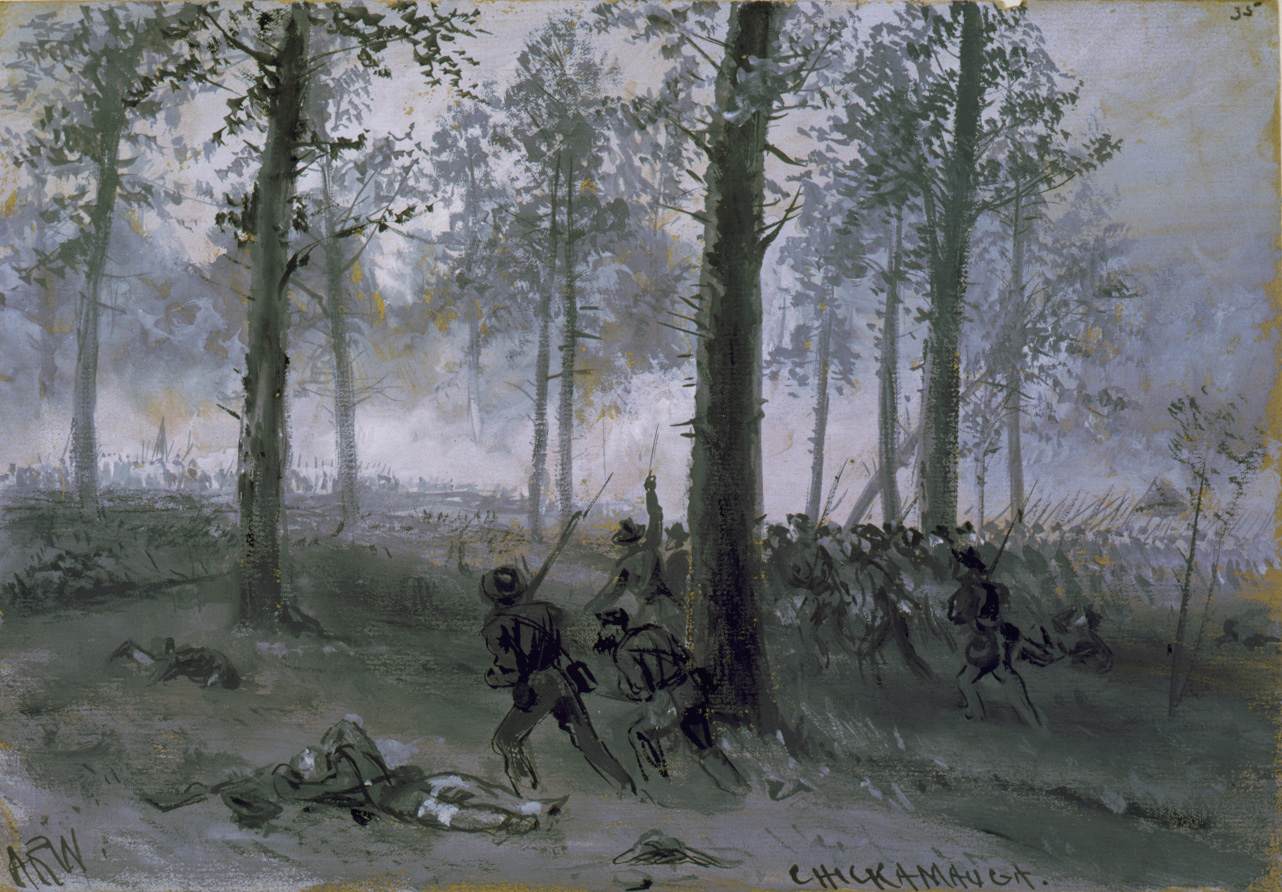
Confederates attack at Chickamauga, Alfred Waud.

Patrick Cleburne decided that the Texans were, "a fine body of men out of which good soldiers are made", and accepted them into his division. The consolidated 6th-10th-15th Texas was sent to Wartrace, Tennessee for training. During the Battle of Chickamauga on 19–20 September 1863, the consolidated regiment was led by Colonel Roger Q. Mills and the brigade was led by Deshler. Brigade losses were 52 killed and 366 wounded, a total of 418 casualties. Deshler was killed, so Mills assumed command of the brigade and Lieutenant Colonel T. Scott Anderson took command of the 6th-10th-15th Texas. The other units in the brigade were the 19th and 24th Consolidated Arkansas Infantry Regiment and the 17th-18th-24th-25th Consolidated Texas Cavalry Regiment (dismounted).

Deshler's brigade was ordered to advance at nightfall on the first day of Chickamauga. The brigade's skirmish line, moving ahead of the battle line, stumbled into one of Richard W. Johnson's Union brigades in the dark woods and most of the skirmishers were captured. In very confused fighting, Deshler's brigade drifted to the left of its intended track. However, one of its regiments helped capture the colonel and 82 men of the 77th Pennsylvania Infantry Regiment. Some of the captured skirmishers escaped in a highly fluid situation. On the second day, Cleburne ordered Deshler's brigade forward to cover the retreat of two brigades that had been driven off. As the brigade reached the crest of a rise, it was struck by a blast of Federal bullets. Cleburne sent orders to Deshler to hold out as long as possible, so the soldiers dropped to the ground and returned fire. For two hours and 30 minutes, Deshler's men held the line, but they suffered hundreds of casualties. Deshler was struck in the chest by an artillery projectile and killed instantly. At 2:00 pm Mills ordered most of the brigade to pull back 20 yd (18 m) and assigned a few sharpshooters to hold the crest. At Chickamauga, the 15th Texas lost five killed, 16 wounded, and 14 captured or missing.

The 6th-10th-15th Texas fought with distinction at the Battle of Missionary Ridge on 24–25 November 1863. The regiment formed part of a brigade under James Argyle Smith together with the 17th-18th-24th-25th Texas Cavalry (dismounted) and the 7th Texas Infantry Regiment. Early on 24 November, William T. Sherman's Union troops crossed the Tennessee River and advanced toward the northern end of Missionary Ridge. The commander of the Confederate Army of Tennessee, Braxton Bragg reacted slowly, but he finally ordered Cleburne to halt Sherman's forces. In the late afternoon, Cleburne deployed Smith's brigade on Tunnel Hill just in time to block Union soldiers from occupying it. Following some skirmishing, Sherman sent John M. Corse's brigade to attack Smith's Texans about 10:30 am on 25 November. A brief counterattack threw the Union troops back, but Smith and Colonel Mills were seriously wounded and Hiram B. Granbury of the 7th Texas took command of the Texas brigade. After Mills fell, Captain John R. Kennard assumed command of the 6th-10th-15th Texas. Major Sanders was shot and had to have his right arm amputated. The initial fighting was followed by uncoordinated and unsuccessful assaults by several Federal brigades. Confederate reinforcements soon arrived, but, as related by another Southern soldier, the Texans were reluctant to give up their position in the front line because, "it was the first time they ever had a chance to fight the Yankees from behind breastworks and that they were rather enjoying it". At 4:00 pm, Cleburne launched a major counterattack by striking the Federals' foothold with Alfred Cumming's brigade in front and the 6th-10th-15th Texas on the right flank. The effort proved entirely successful and chased the Union troops off Tunnel Hill, capturing many prisoners. The 15th Texas sustained losses of one killed, seven wounded, and two missing.

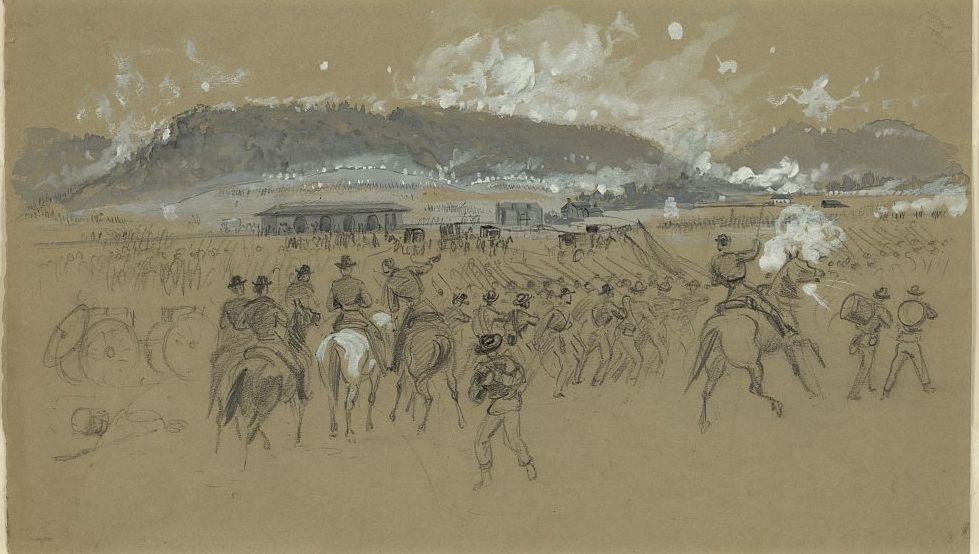
Battle of Ringgold Gap, by Alfred Waud

The 6th-10th-15th Texas fought at the Battle of Ringgold Gap on 27 November 1863. Cleburne deployed Granbury's brigade just to the north of the gap. Attacked by Charles R. Woods's Federal brigade, the Texans opened fire and routed the three leading Missouri regiments. At Ringgold Gap, the 15th Texas lost four men wounded and one captured. During the Atlanta campaign in 1864, the 15th Texas Cavalry remained consolidated with the 6th Texas Infantry, but the 10th Texas became an independent regiment again. At different times during the campaign, the 6th-15th Texas was commanded by Captains R. Fisher, Matthew M. Houston, J. W. Terrill, R. B. Tyus, S. E. Rice, and Lieutenant T. L. Flint. The Texas brigade, which consisted of the 7th and 10th Infantry, and the 17th-18th and 24th-25th Dismounted Cavalry, was led by Smith, Granbury, and Robert B. Young at various times. The 6th-15th Texas fought at the Battle of Rocky Face Ridge, the Battle of Resaca, the Battle of Pickett's Mill, the Battle of Dallas, the Battle of Kennesaw Mountain, the Battle of Peachtree Creek, the Battle of Atlanta, and the Battle of Jonesborough. In these actions, the 15th Texas lost 13 killed, 58 wounded, and three captured.

After the fall of Atlanta, John Bell Hood mounted an invasion of Tennessee in the Franklin–Nashville Campaign. On 30 November, Hood launched a 3:30 pm assault with 38,000 men against 32,000 entrenched Federals under John Schofield. In the Battle of Franklin, the divisions of Cleburne and John C. Brown overran the Union rearguard and broke into the enemy position but were finally driven out by reserve formations. Nevertheless, repeated assaults continued until 9:00 pm when Hood called a halt. The Confederates suffered 6,252 casualties while Union losses were 2,326 of whom half were prisoners. Cleburne, Granbury, and three other Confederate generals were killed. Granbury's brigade started the battle with 1,100 soldiers but ended it with only 450. The 15th Texas lost seven killed including Captain Houston, 10 wounded, and 13 missing. At the Battle of Nashville on 15–16 December, the division was led by Smith while the Granbury's former brigade was led by Captain E. T. Broughton and the 6th-15th Texas was commanded by Captain Tyus.

In the Campaign of the Carolinas, the survivors of the Texas brigade were consolidated into a single unit, the 1st Texas under Lieutenant Colonel W. A. Ryan. The 1st Texas was part of Daniel Govan's brigade in Brown's division. Sherman's 60,000 Federal troops marched from Savannah, Georgia, through South Carolina, and into North Carolina before encountering significant resistance from 21,000 Confederate troops at the Battle of Averasborough on 16 March 1865 and the Battle of Bentonville on 19–21 March. Confederate army commander Joseph E. Johnston surrendered to Sherman on 26 April 1865. At the surrender, the 15th Texas Cavalry counted three officers, eight non-commissioned officers, 30 enlisted men, and two teamsters. Altogether, 1,200 men served in the regiment during the war. The last survivor of the 15th Cavalry, Thomas Jasper Franks died in 1939.

== See also ==
- List of Texas Civil War Confederate units
