= 10th Texas Infantry Regiment =

Infantry regiment of the Confederate States Army

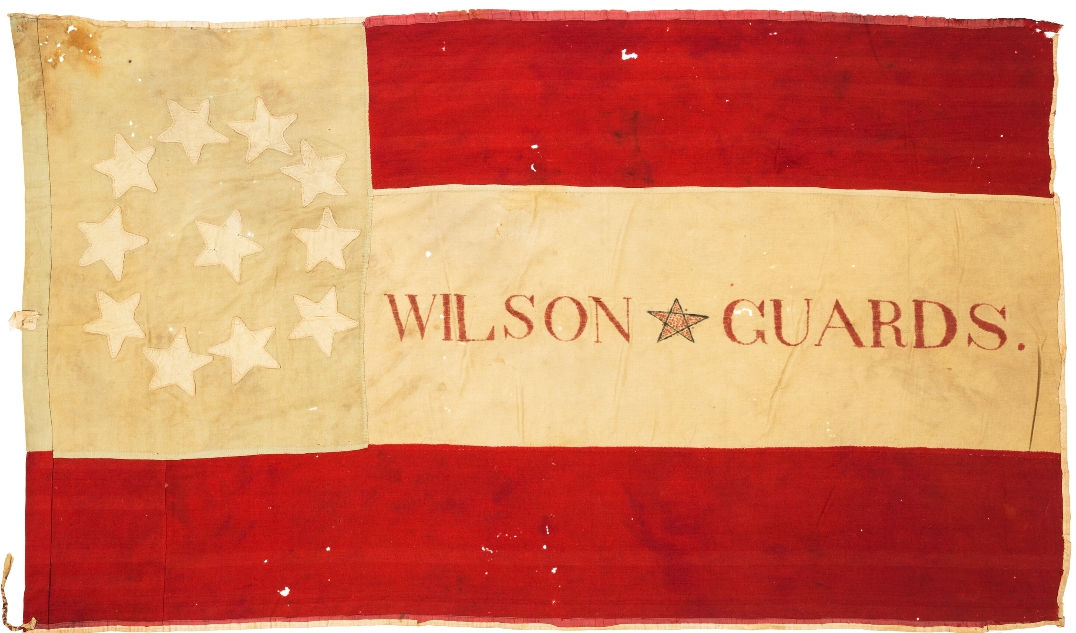
- National color of the "Wilson Guards;" mustered into service as Company D, 10th Texas Infantry Regiment
- Active: 1861–1865
- Disbanded: May 1, 1865
- Country: Confederate States
- Allegiance: Texas
- Branch: Army
- Type: Infantry
- Size: Regiment
- Nickname: "Nelson's regiment"
- Facings: Light blue
- Equipment: Rifled musket
- Battles: American Civil War; Battle of Arkansas Post (POW); Battle of Chickamauga; Battle of Chattanooga; Battle of Ringgold Gap; Battle of Resaca; Battle of Rocky Face Ridge; Battle of Kennesaw Mountain; Battle of Atlanta; Battle of Jonesborough; Battle of Franklin; Battle of Nashville; Battle of Averasborough; Battle of Bentonville

Commanders
- Notable commanders: Allison Nelson; Roger Q. Mills

The 10th Texas Infantry Regiment, also known as "Nelson's regiment", was an infantry formation of the Confederate States Army in the Trans-Mississippi and Western theaters of the American Civil War.

The regiment was captured in its first major action at Arkansas Post in January 1863. After being exchanged three months later, the 10th Texas was consolidated with two other regiments and assigned to Patrick Cleburne's division. Subsequently, the consolidated regiment fought at Chickamauga, Chattanooga, and Ringgold Gap in 1863.

After becoming an independent regiment again, the 10th Texas Infantry Regiment fought in the Atlanta campaign, and at Franklin and Nashville in 1864. After a second consolidation the troops fought at Averasborough and Bentonville in 1865. Surviving members of the regiment were paroled at Greensboro, North Carolina, on May 1, 1865.

== History ==
=== Formation ===
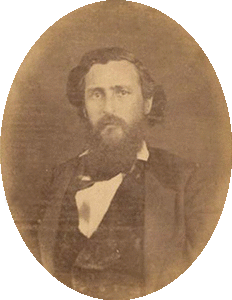
Allison Nelson was the first colonel.

The regiment was organized by Allison Nelson in the fall and winter of 1861 and consisted of six infantry companies. The unit was made up of men from the Texas counties of Anderson, Bosque, Coryell, Erath, Fannin, Freestone, Grimes, Harris, Johnson, Limestone, Milam, Parker, San Augustine, and Washington. In addition to Colonel Nelson, the field officers included Lieutenant Colonel Semore C. Brasher and Major John R. Kennard. Nelson was a veteran of the Mexican–American War and had become involved in filibuster Narciso López's unsuccessful attempt to free Cuba from Spanish control. Nelson served in the Texas legislature and became a delegate who voted for secession.

=== 1861–1863 ===
From October 1861 to March 1862, the 10th Texas was assigned to the Eastern District of the Department of Texas. In May 1862 the regiment was reassigned to the Trans-Mississippi Department and that August it was transferred again to the Department of Arkansas. Nelson was promoted brigadier general on 12 September 1862 while the regiment camped at DeValls Bluff, Arkansas under the overall command of Thomas C. Hindman. Nelson briefly led a division but he died soon after. In late 1862, the 10th Texas formed part of the 4th Brigade of Walker's Texas Division under John George Walker. However, the 4th Brigade under James Deshler was soon detached from the division and ordered to Arkansas Post. Accordingly, the 10th Texas was sent to defend Arkansas Post in January 1863.

In the Battle of Arkansas Post, the 5,000 Confederate defenders under Thomas James Churchill were attacked by 30,000 Union troops led by John Alexander McClernand and 13 gunboats under David Dixon Porter. The Federal expedition sailed up the Arkansas River in 50 transports and landed the soldiers below the post on 9 January 1863. The Union troops began sealing off the position the following day. That night Churchill was ordered to hold Arkansas Post at all costs. A coordinated land and naval assault on 11 January 1863 overwhelmed the defenders and forced 4,791 Confederates to surrender. The Federals sustained 1,061 casualties. The 10th Texas under Colonel Roger Q. Mills fought in Deshler's brigade which also included the 15th Texas, 17th Texas, and 18th Texas Cavalry Regiments, fighting dismounted.

=== 1863–1865 ===
The soldiers of the 10th Texas were freed in a prisoner exchange in April 1863. In a reorganization, the regiment was consolidated with the 6th Texas Infantry and the 15th Texas Cavalry (dismounted) Regiments. From 31 July to 1 September 1863, the consolidated regiment served in Churchill's brigade of Patrick Cleburne's division in Daniel Harvey Hill's corps. On the latter date, Deshler took command of the brigade. During the Battle of Chickamauga on 19–20 September 1863, the 6th-10th-15th Texas fought under the command of Colonel Mills. Deshler's brigade lost 52 killed and 366 wounded, a total of 418 casualties during the fighting. When Deshler was killed, Mills took command of the brigade and Lieutenant Colonel T. Scott Anderson took command of the 6th-10th-15th Texas. The other units in the brigade were the 19th and 24th Consolidated Arkansas Infantry Regiment and the 17th-18th-24th-25th Consolidated Texas Cavalry Regiment (dismounted). During the battle, the 6th-10th-15th Texas lost 20 killed, 95 wounded, and 28 missing.

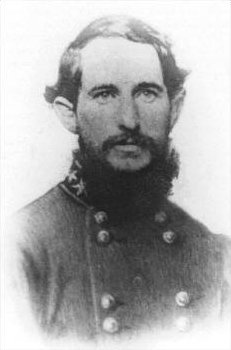
James Deshler

Deshler's brigade was committed to battle at nightfall on the first day of Chickamauga. The brigade's skirmish line, moving ahead of the battle line, blundered into one of Richard W. Johnson's Union brigades in the dark forest and most of the skirmishers were captured. In extremely muddled fighting, Deshler's brigade drifted off to the left, but one of its regiments helped capture the colonel and 82 men of the 77th Pennsylvania Infantry Regiment. In the confusion, some of the captured skirmishers escaped. On the second day, Cleburne sent Deshler's brigade forward to cover the withdrawal of two brigades that had been repulsed. As the brigade reached the crest of a rise, the troops were hit by a storm of Federal bullets. The men were quickly ordered to lie down and Cleburne sent orders to Deshler to hold out as long as possible. For two hours and 30 minutes, Deshler's brigade held the line, but suffered hundreds of casualties. Deshler was struck in the chest by an artillery round and killed instantly. At 2:00 pm Mills ordered the brigade to withdraw 20 yd (18 m) while holding the crest with a handful of sharpshooters.

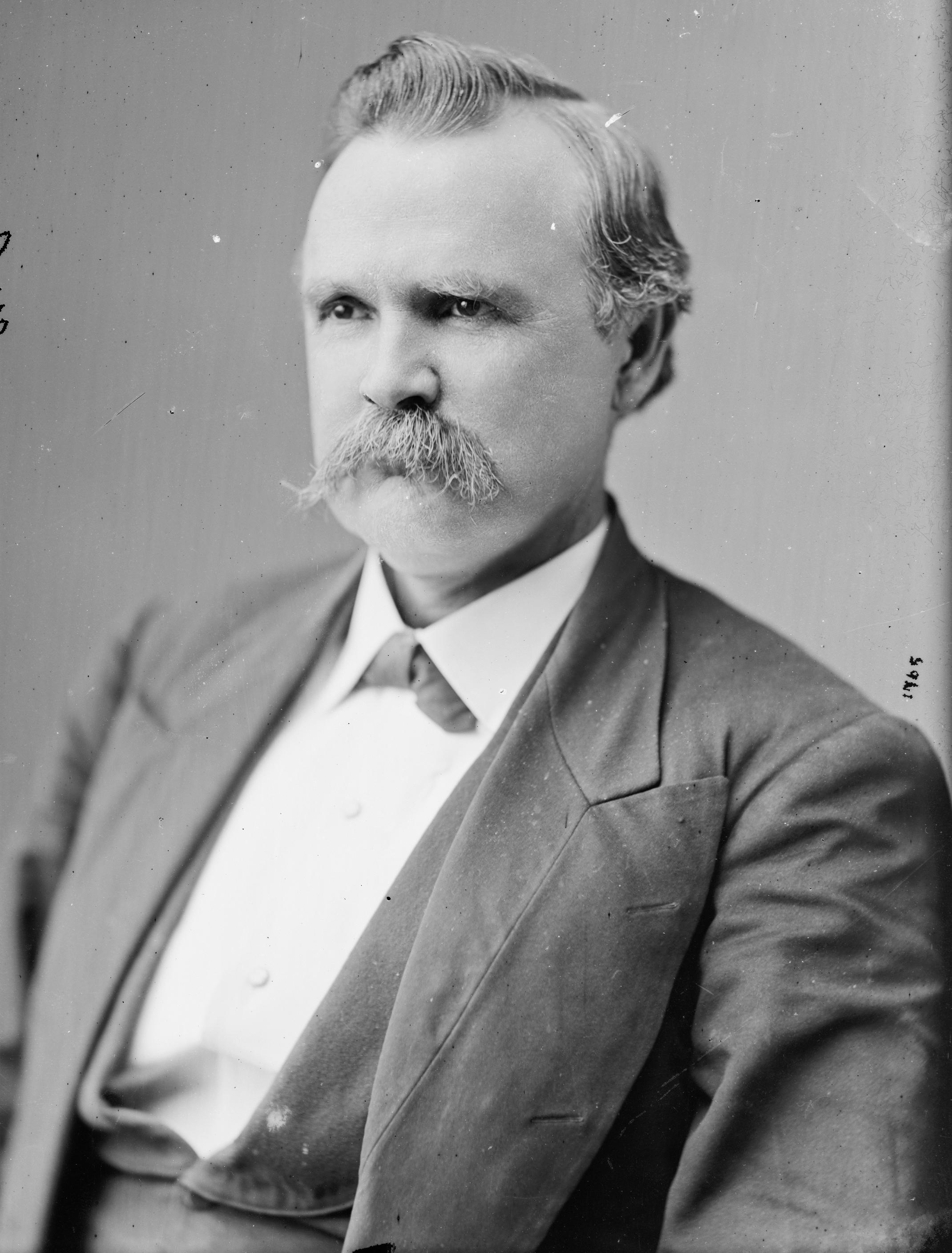
Roger Q. Mills

On 31 October 1863, the 6th-10th-15th Texas was assigned to James Argyle Smith's Texas brigade. Later, the brigade fought in the Battle of Chattanooga. Early in the morning of 24 November, William T. Sherman's forces crossed the Tennessee River and moved toward the northern edge of Missionary Ridge. Braxton Bragg, the commander of the Confederate Army of Tennessee was slow to respond, but finally ordered Cleburne to block Sherman's troops. In the late afternoon, Cleburne deployed Smith's brigade on Tunnel Hill just in time to prevent Union soldiers from seizing it. After some skirmishing, Sherman launched John M. Corse's brigade at Smith's Texans about 10:30 am on 25 November. A counterattack hurled the Federal troops back, but both Smith and Colonel Mills were badly wounded. Hiram B. Granbury assumed command of the Texas brigade. After Mills was wounded, Kennard took command of the 6th-10th-15th Texas. At this time the Arkansas unit was no longer part of the brigade. The initial fighting was followed by piecemeal assaults by several Union brigades, which were unsuccessful. Confederate reinforcements soon arrived, but, according to another Rebel soldier, the Texans refused to yield their place in the front line, saying, "it was the first time they ever had a chance to fight the Yankees from behind breastworks and that they were rather enjoying it". At 4:00 pm, Cleburne mounted a counterattack by hitting the Federals with Alfred Cumming's brigade in front and the 6th-10th-15th Texas on their right flank. The effort was completely successful and swept the Union troops off Tunnel Hill, taking many prisoners.

The 6th-10th-15th Texas fought at the Battle of Ringgold Gap on 27 November 1863. Cleburne posted Granbury's brigade just to the north of the gap. When they were attacked by Charles R. Woods's Union brigade, the Texans routed the three leading Missouri regiments. On 10 December the regiment counted 642 soldiers and it was assigned to Smith's brigade in Cleburne's division. During the Atlanta campaign in 1864, the brigade fought at the Battle of Rocky Face Ridge, the Battle of Resaca, the Battle of Pickett's Mill, the Battle of Kennesaw Mountain, the Battle of Peachtree Creek, the Battle of Atlanta, and the Battle of Jonesborough. For the campaign, the 10th Texas became an independent regiment by separating from the consolidated 6th-15th Texas. At various times during the campaign, the 10th Texas was commanded by Colonel Mills, Captain A. J. Formwalt, and Lieutenant Colonel Robert B. Young. The Texas brigade, which now included the 7th Texas Infantry Regiment, was led at different times by Smith, Granbury, and Young.

The 10th Texas took part in John Bell Hood's invasion of Tennessee and fought at the Battle of Franklin on 30 November 1864 and the Battle of Nashville on 15–16 December. At Franklin, the Confederate soldiers assaulted the Union lines with great determination and persistence, but they were ultimately repulsed. Both the Texas brigade's commander Granbury and its division commander Cleburne were killed. At Nashville, the division was led by Smith while the Texas brigade was commanded by Captain E. T. Broughton and the 10th Texas was led by Captain R. D. Kennedy. The regiment fought at the Battle of Averasborough on 16 March 1865 and the Battle of Bentonville on 19–21 March. In this campaign, the remnant of the Texas brigade was consolidated into a single unit, the 1st Texas under Lieutenant Colonel W. A. Ryan. The 1st Texas was part of Daniel Govan's brigade in John C. Brown's division. The 10th Texas surrendered to Sherman's Union army on 26 April 1865 at Durham, North Carolina.

== See also ==
- List of Texas Civil War Confederate units
