= Roger Q. Mills =

American politician (1832–1911)

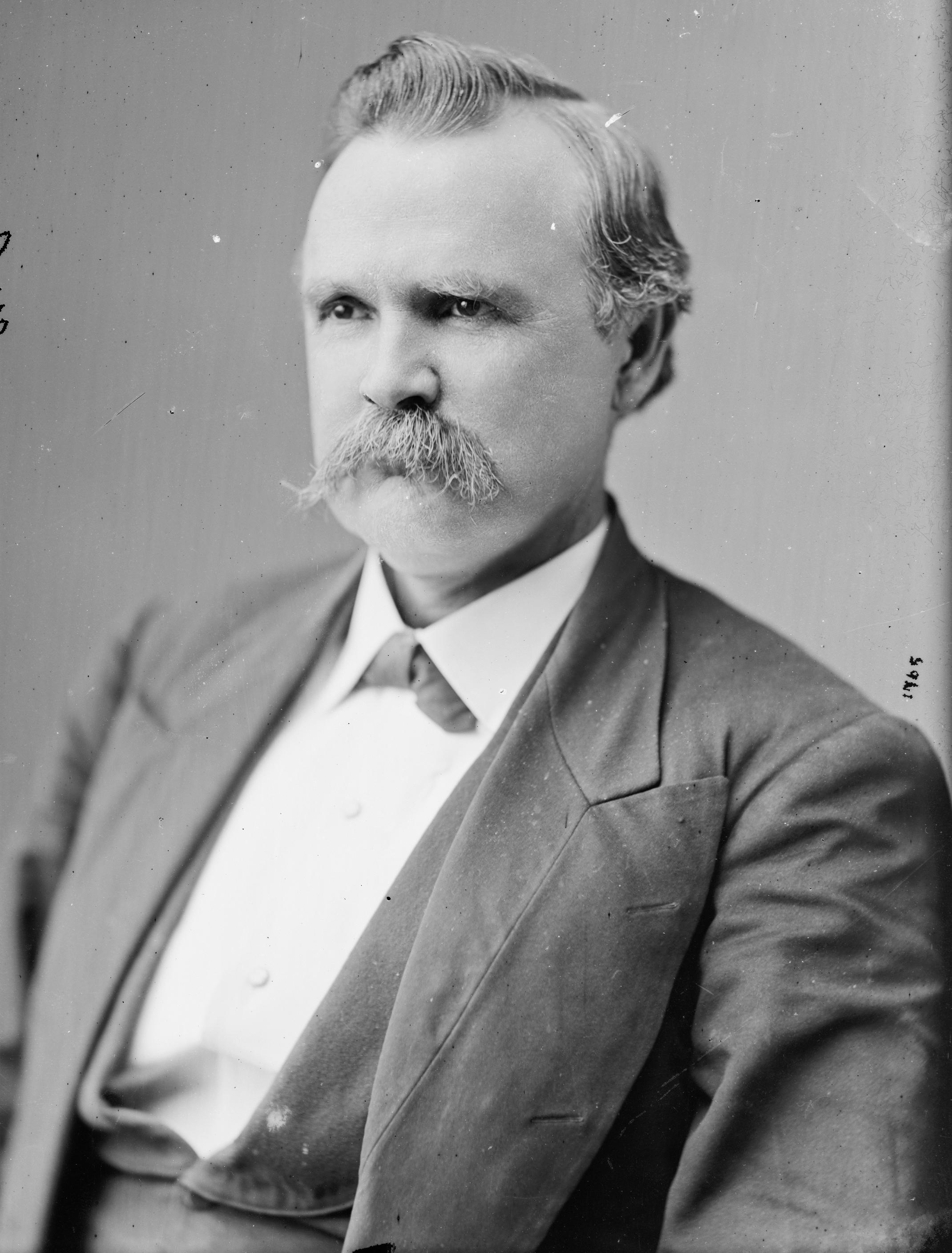
- Mills, 1865–1880

United States Senator from Texas
- In office March 30, 1892 – March 3, 1899
- Preceded by: Horace Chilton
- Succeeded by: Charles A. Culberson

Member of the U.S. House of Representatives from Texas
- In office March 4, 1873 – March 29, 1892
- Preceded by: District created
- Succeeded by: David B. Culberson
- Constituency: At-large (1873–75); 4th district (1875–83); 9th district (1883–92)

Member of the Texas House of Representatives from the 43rd district
- In office November 7, 1859 – November 4, 1861
- Preceded by: Benjamin Carroll
- Succeeded by: Richard Montgomery Gano

Personal details
- Born: Roger Quarles Mills; March 30, 1832 Todd County, Kentucky, US
- Died: September 2, 1911 (aged 79) Corsicana, Texas, US
- Resting place: Oakwood Cemetery, Corsicana, Texas, US
- Party: Democratic

Military service
- Allegiance: Confederate States of America
- Branch/service: Confederate States Army
- Years of service: 1861–1865
- Rank: Colonel
- Unit: 3rd Texas Cavalry Regiment
- Commands: 10th Texas Infantry Regiment; Deshler's Brigade
- Battles/wars: American Civil War: Battle of Wilson's Creek; Battle of Arkansas Post; Battle of Chickamauga; Battle of Atlanta; Battle of Missionary Ridge

Roger Quarles Mills (March 30, 1832 – September 2, 1911) was an American lawyer and Democratic Party politician who represented Texas in the United States House of Representatives from 1873 to 1892 and the United States Senate from 1892 to 1899. He served as an officer in the Confederate States Army during the American Civil War.

As the leading Democrat on the influential United States House Committee on Ways and Means during the first Grover Cleveland and Benjamin Harrison administrations, Mills advocated for trade liberalization. Despite his efforts, he did not succeed in passing significant tariff reduction legislation. Additionally, he was unable to block the enactment of the McKinley Tariff of 1890 after Republicans gained control of the House on a pro-tariff platform. Mills also ran for Speaker after Democrats regained control of the House in 1891 but was defeated by Charles F. Crisp.

== Early life ==
Born in Todd County, Kentucky, Mills attended common schools before relocating to Texas in 1849. There, he pursued legal studies, passed the bar exam, and commenced his law practice in Corsicana at the age of 20, following an exception made by the Texas legislature to the usual age requirement. He served as a member of the Texas House of Representatives from 1859 until 1860. Mills then enlisted in the Confederate States Army during the Civil War. Throughout the conflict, he participated in various engagements, including serving as a private in the Battle of Wilson's Creek. Later, as a colonel, he commanded the 10th Texas Infantry Regiment at Arkansas Post, Chickamauga (where he led the brigade of Gen. James Deshler during part of the battle), Missionary Ridge and the Atlanta campaign.

== U.S. Representative ==
He was then elected as a Democrat to the US House of Representatives and served from 1873 to 1892. In 1891, Mills was a candidate in the Democratic caucus for Speaker of the U.S. House of Representatives, but he was defeated by Charles F. Crisp (1845–1896) of Georgia.

During the 1880s, amidst rising Prohibition sentiment in Texas, Mills refused to make any political concessions. In one speech, he reportedly declared, "If lightning were to strike all the drunkards, there would not be a live Prohibition party in Texas." (Mills claimed to have been misquoted and that he had said "there would not be many [members of the party] left.") Elsewhere, he was said to have vowed, "A good sluice of pine top whiskey would improve the morals of the Dallas [Prohibition] convention and the average Prohibitionist." (Mills again offered a correction, denying he had used the words "average Prohibitionist.").

Mills quickly regained recognition as one of the ablest, albeit hottest-tempered, debaters on the Democratic side of the House. He was commonly agreed to be a man "possessed of the demon of work." The reporter Frank G. Carpenter described him as true as steel and unpretentious in dress: "He is tall, straight and big chested," he wrote in 1888. "The distance between the top button of his high vest and the small of his back is longer than the width of the shoulders of the ordinary man, and he has a biceps which, if put into training, would knock down an ox. He is a fighter, too, and goes into this Congressional struggle with a brain trained to warfare.... He is a successful man, and one who inspires confidence."

=== Chairmanship of the Committee on Ways and Means ===
Mills had made the tariff his special study and long been recognized as one of the leading authorities on the Democratic side. After the defeat of House Ways and Means Committee Chairman William Morrison in the 1886 election, Mills became the next chair of the U.S. House Committee on Ways and Means when the 50th Congress met. His selection, according to Ida Tarbell, a historian on the tariff, "was a red rag to the high protectionists, for Mr. Mills was an out-and-out free trader." Debate over the tariff issue had been thrust upon the United States by President Grover Cleveland in his annual December message to Congress on December 6, 1887. He requested for Congress to pass a drastic reduction of the tariff on many manufactured goods to promote trade and reduce the cost of living for ordinary citizens. Indeed, Chairman Mills, using the Walker Tariff of 1846 as a guideline, had been drafting a bill since September 1887 that would address several of the proposals included by Cleveland in his December message. As it turned out, most of Mills's work went for naught, as he later explained: "When I got to work with my brethren on the bill I found that it would not go, and I had to abandon my ad valorem tariff bill. The schoolmaster had not been sufficiently around, to bring our people back to the Democratic principle of taxation as to value." The bill became known as the "Mills Tariff Bill of 1888." The Mills Bill was reported out of the Ways and Means Committee in April 1888.

The bill provided for a reduction of the duties on sugar, earthenware, glassware, plate glass, woolen goods and other articles; the substitution of ad valorem for specific duties in many cases; and the placing of lumber (of certain kinds), hemp, wool, flax, borax, tin plates, salt and other articles on the free list. The bill looked likely to split the Democratic Party. Just two years previously, the high tariff wing of the Democratic Party had been able to muster 35 votes in the House. However, the Mills Bill had now become so highly partisan that when the bill was passed by the Democratic House on July 21, 1888, only four Democratic representatives voted against it. The high-tariff wing of the Democratic Party had largely been wiped out by the passage of the Mills Bill of 1888.

Although the Mills Bill passed the House, the Republican Senate amended it heavily, and it never passed into law. Instead, it became the chief issue in the 1888 presidential election. Critics warned that American manufacturers could not compete against the flood of manufactured goods from Britain, and campaign crowds marched the streets chanting, "No! no! no Free Trade!" (However, the bill was not anything close to being a free-trade measure but offered an average reduction of only seven percent, and many items were left untouched.) "If Mills of Texas does not shut down, many other mills will have to," a California newspaper warned. In the 1888 election, Republican Benjamin Harrison, a strong high-tariff supporter lost the popular vote nationwide to Cleveland, but Harrison managed to narrowly win both swing states of New York and Indiana and so won the presidency in the Electoral College-based, largely by the tariff issue.

=== 1891 speakership candidacy ===
Mills was known to have aspirations to be speaker after the retirement of John G. Carlisle. In late 1891, with the House returning to Democratic control, the Texas representative put himself in the running against Representative Charles Crisp from Georgia. Before the caucus met, Mills had 120 votes pledged to him, and if all of them had kept their word, he would have won, but only 105 did so on the final, thirtieth, ballot, against Crisp's 119. The reason, apparently, was that Mills refused to make deals.

Some two dozen members wanted a guarantee of specific committee assignments in return for their support, but Mills would have none of it. Reportedly, Representative William Springer of Illinois, who was also contending to be speaker, offered to drop out if Mills would appoint him chair of Ways and Means and was told gruffly to put his offer in writing. As a result, the night before the caucus voted, Springer withdrew on Crisp's behalf, and Crisp made him chairman of Ways and Means, subsequently. To Representative Tom Johnson of Cleveland, one of Mills's most earnest backers, the Texas representative's conduct looked like political insanity. "I wish you wouldn't be a fool," he burst out; "give me two chairmanships and ask me no questions and I will elect you on the next ballot." He got only a shake of the head in reply.

The regularity with which Mills lost his temper made many of his party friends worry that he lacked the self-control necessary to be speaker. The party's job would be hard enough without what one newspaper called Mills's "tempestuous style." His selection would have signaled that the Democratic Party's main agenda would be lowering the tariff drastically. Crisp was much less associated with tariff reform than with the coinage of free silver, which, to most Southern Democrats, was the top issue by late 1891. Among the Silver Democrats, it did not help Mills to have former President Cleveland's backing or, among those favoring the presidential nomination of Cleveland's rival, Senator David Bennett Hill of New York, that Hill threw his weight behind Crisp's candidacy, too.

Mills took badly to his rejection, issuing a letter that was quickly made public that the Democratic Party had been hurt more than he by his rejection as well as threatening that "a large element that has been voting with us [would] abandon us" in the coming election unless those who had defeated him were met with rebuke by their party.

== US Senator ==
Mills was elected to the US Senate from Texas in 1892 to fill the vacant seat of John H. Reagan and continued to serve in that post until 1899.

In 1893, when President Grover Cleveland sought repeal of the Sherman Silver Purchase Act, Mills gave loyal support. Silver coinage was popular with both parties in Texas, and Democrats in particular felt that Mills had betrayed them. His action probably cost him re-election in 1898.

Other friends also noticed a change in him. His old colleague and co-worker in tariff reform, former Representative William L. Wilson of West Virginia, wrote in his diary in 1896, "Poor Mills, how he seems to have gone to pieces since the time when he was leading the tariff reform forces in the House, and a welcome and strong speaker on that great issue all over the country. Today he made one of the most extreme and wild jingo speeches in the Senate on the Cuban question that has marked the whole debate. Not less erratic has been his course for two years past on the financial question."

== Death and legacy ==
He died in Corsicana, Texas. Roger Mills County, Oklahoma, was named after him.

== Sources ==
- United States Congress. "Roger Q. Mills (id: M000777)". Biographical Directory of the United States Congress. Retrieved on 2009-05-04
- This article incorporates text from a publication now in the public domain: Chisholm, Hugh, ed. (1911). "Mills, Roger Quarles". Encyclopædia Britannica (11th ed.). Cambridge University Press.

U.S. House of Representatives
Preceded by District created	Member of the U.S. House of Representatives from Texas's at-large congressional seat 1873–1875	Succeeded by John Hancock
Preceded by John Hancock	Member of the U.S. House of Representatives from Texas's 4th congressional district 1875–1883	Succeeded by David B. Culberson
Preceded by District created	Member of the U.S. House of Representatives from Texas's 9th congressional district 1883–1892	Succeeded by Edwin Le Roy Antony
Political offices
Preceded by William Ralls Morrison	Chairman of the U.S. House Committee on Ways and Means; 1887–1889	Succeeded by William McKinley
U.S. Senate
Preceded by Horace Chilton	U.S. senator (Class 1) from Texas; 1892–1899; Served alongside: Richard Coke, Horace Chilton	Succeeded by Charles A. Culberson
