= Battle of Ringgold Gap =

1863 battle of the American Civil War

Coordinates: 34.9112°N 85.1015°W

- Part of the American Civil War
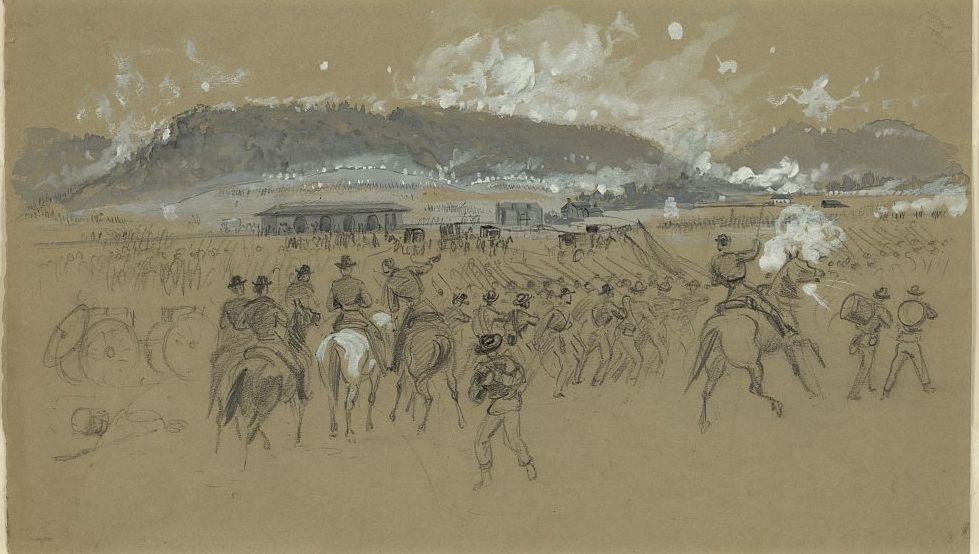
- Sketch of the Battle of Ringgold Gap
Date	November 27, 1863
Location	Catoosa County, Georgia
Result	Confederate victory

Belligerents
United States (Union)	(Confederate States of America) CSA (Confederacy)

Commanders and leaders
Joseph Hooker	Patrick Cleburne

Strength
16,000	4,200

Casualties and losses
509 (67 KIA, 442 WIA)	221 (20 KIA, 201 WIA)

The Battle of Ringgold Gap was fought November 27, 1863, outside the town of Ringgold, Georgia, by the Confederate and Union armies during the American Civil War. Part of the Chattanooga campaign, it followed a heavy Confederate loss at the Battle of Missionary Ridge from which General Braxton Bragg's artillery and wagon trains were forced to retreat south. The five hour Battle of Ringgold Gap resulted in the Confederate victory of Major General Patrick R. Cleburne and gave the Army of Tennessee safe passage to retreat through the Ringgold Gap mountain pass.

== Background ==
The disastrous Confederate rout at Battle of Missionary Ridge on November 25 forced the Army of Tennessee to retreat into northwest Georgia. On November 26, the army made its way south towards Dalton. To allow time for his artillery and wagon trains to safely pass through the gap, Confederate General Braxton Bragg sent Patrick Cleburne's unit of 4,157 men to defend it from the Union army. While Cleburne expressed doubt he could defend the gap adequately with his single division, Bragg refused to send any further troops to assist Cleburne. Cleburne and his men proceeded south and reached Ringgold around 10:00 p.m. After crossing through the East Chickamauga Creek, Cleburne's army made camp in the mountain pass known as the Ringgold Gap.

All accounts the Union received about Bragg's army suggested a hasty and unorganized retreat following the Battle of Missionary Ridge. The Union commander at Chattanooga, Ulysses S. Grant, had ordered a pursuit of the retreating Confederate army on the morning of November 26, but confusion over the orders prevented the Union forces from getting an early start. General Joseph Hooker was given command of divisions from the IV Corps, XI Corps, XII Corps, and XV Corps and sent to cut off the Western and Atlantic railroad in pursuit of the Confederate rear guard. However, when the Union forces arrived, they found that the Confederates had burned the bridges over Chickamauga Creek. Having finally reached Ringgold Gap around 10:00 p.m., Hooker halted two and a half miles from the Confederate army during the night of November 26–27.

=== Plans and movement to battle ===
Upon the Confederate army's arrival at Ringgold Gap, Cleburne deployed his men in three strategic locations — at Taylor's Ridge, White Oak Mountain, and within the gap itself. To the south, three Alabama regiments were stationed in the woods of Taylor's Ridge under the leadership of Major Frederick Ashford. Brigadier General Mark Perrin Lowrey and Lucius Polk's troops of the Confederate Reserve were sent to guard the passage at Taylor's Ridge. Further north, Brigadier General Hiram B. Granbury's Texas brigade was sent to defend against attack from White Oak Mountain. To his right, Major William Taylor was stationed with members of the 17th, 18th, 24th, and 25th Texas cavalry. Inside Ringgold Gap, Brigadier General Daniel Govan led four Arkansas divisions alongside Captain C.E. Talley of the 7th Texas. Cleburne's tactical position was completed with the placement of two cannons at the opening of the gap along with a regiment under the leadership of Richard Goldthwaite.

Around 8:00 a.m. on the morning of November 27, Hooker dispatched Major General Peter Osterhaus and his division to scout the area. While out, they encountered Cleburne's watchmen, who raced back to the Ringgold Gap to inform Cleburne of their encounter and the impending battle.

== Armies ==
=== Union ===
Ulysses S. Grant had the following forces available in the Battle of Ringgold Gap under the leadership of Joseph Hooker:

- The Second Division of the XII Corps, under Brigadier General John Geary.
  - 1st Brigade, under Colonel William Creighton and Lieutenant Orrin Crane, consisting of the 7th Ohio, 66th Ohio, 28th Pennsylvania, and 147th Pennsylvania.
  - 3rd Brigade, under Colonel David Ireland, consisting of the 60th New York and 149th New York.
- The First Division of the XV Corps, under Brigadier General Peter Osterhaus.
  - 1st Brigade, under Brigadier General Charles Woods, consisting of the 13th Illinois, 3rd Missouri, 12th Missouri, 29th Missouri, 31st Missouri, and 76th Ohio.
  - 2nd Brigade, under Colonel James Williamson, consisting of the 4th Iowa, 9th Iowa, and 26th Iowa.

=== Confederate ===
Braxton Bragg's Army of Tennessee had the following forces available in the Battle of Ringgold Gap under the leadership of Patrick Cleburne:

- Liddell's Brigade, under Colonel Daniel Govan, consisting of eight Arkansas regiments including the 2nd Arkansas, 5th Arkansas, 6th Arkansas, 7th Arkansas, 8th Arkansas, 13th Arkansas, 15th Arkansas, and 19th Arkansas.
- Lowrey's Brigade, under Brigadier General Mark Lowrey, consisting of three Alabama regiments under Major Frederick Ashford and three Tennessee regiments.
- Polk's Brigade, under Brigadier General Lucius Polk, consisting of the 1st Arkansas and three Tennessee regiments including the 2nd Tennessee, 35th Tennessee, and 48th Tennessee.
- Smith's Brigade, under Colonel Hiram Granbury, consisting of the 7th Texas under Captain Charles Talley and the Texas Cavalry under Major William Taylor.
- Semple's (Alabama) Battery of the Artillery Battalion, under Lieutenant Richard Goldthwaite.

== Battle ==
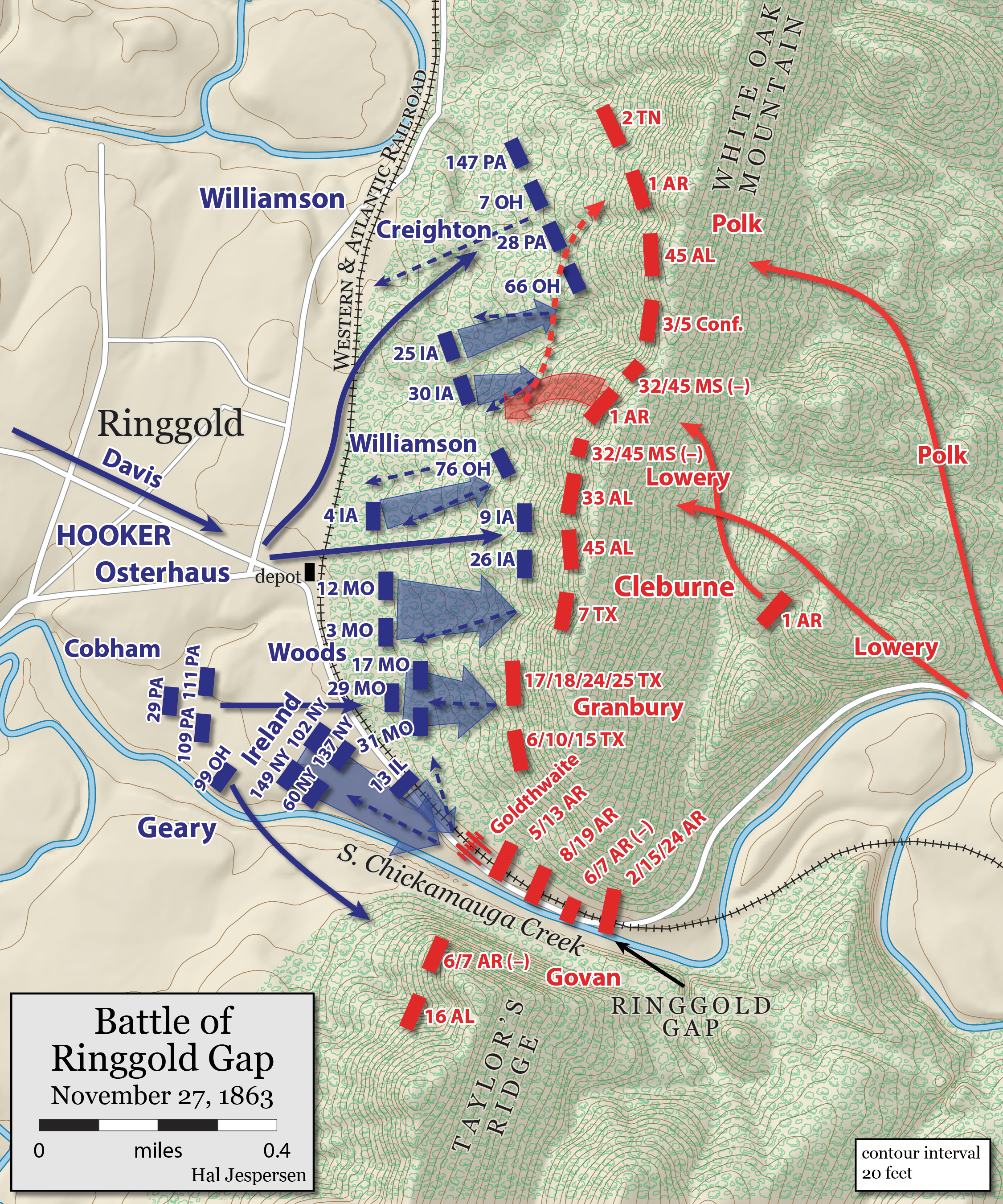
Battle of Ringgold Gap, map by Hal Jespersen

Arriving at his lookout point from the depot, Hooker saw a small line of infantrymen and decided to deploy his forces into the gap without his artillery. Under the command of General Charles Woods, his brigade entered the gap, but were quickly driven back by Granbury's unit. The Confederates held their fire until the Union line was fifty yards away. Upon Cleburne's orders, Goldthwaite's men fired three shots from the disguised twelve-pound Napoleon cannons while the rest of the Army of Tennessee exchanged fire with the bluecoats.

Believing they could gain a tactical advantage, Woods sent the 13th Illinois right to seek shelter in the buildings of Jobes Farm. After another failed attempt against Cleburne's troops, Woods' troops were halted by gunfire from Taylor's Ridge and cannon fire from within the gap. To counter the opposition, Osterhaus sent the 76th Ohio and 4th Iowa to attack the Confederate forces on Taylor's Ridge. The initial volley disorganized Osterhaus's division and his Union forces were unable to advance from their position for the remainder of the battle.

John Geary's XII Corps division was the next to arrive around 10:40 a.m. Under the command of David Ireland, one brigade again attacked the Confederate right while another regiment attacked the gap. As they moved further into the gap, both forces were halted by heavy Confederate fire from Taylor's Ridge and White Oak Mountain. Simultaneously, William Creighton and Orrin Crane's 1st Brigade was sent to support Williamson's 2nd Brigade on White Oak Mountain. The brigade was driven back by Polk and Lowrey's regiments, and Creighton was killed during an attempt to rally his men against the Confederates.

After holding his position for five hours, Cleburne received communications from Bragg around 12:00 p.m. notifying him that the army had made it safely through the gap and he could begin his retreat. Leaving skirmishers along his front to hide his withdrawal, he pulled back from the gap about 2:00 p.m. and burned the bridge on the eastern side of the gap. Grant arrived near the gap, and the scattered position of his army made him decide to return to Chattanooga; no further Union pursuit was organized.

== Aftermath ==
Cleburne had lost 20 killed and 201 wounded during the battle. Union casualties totaled 509 killed and wounded. Although Hooker was severely criticized for his conduct of the battle by Union Assistant Secretary of War Dana and several of Hooker's men, Grant chose to retain Hooker temporarily.

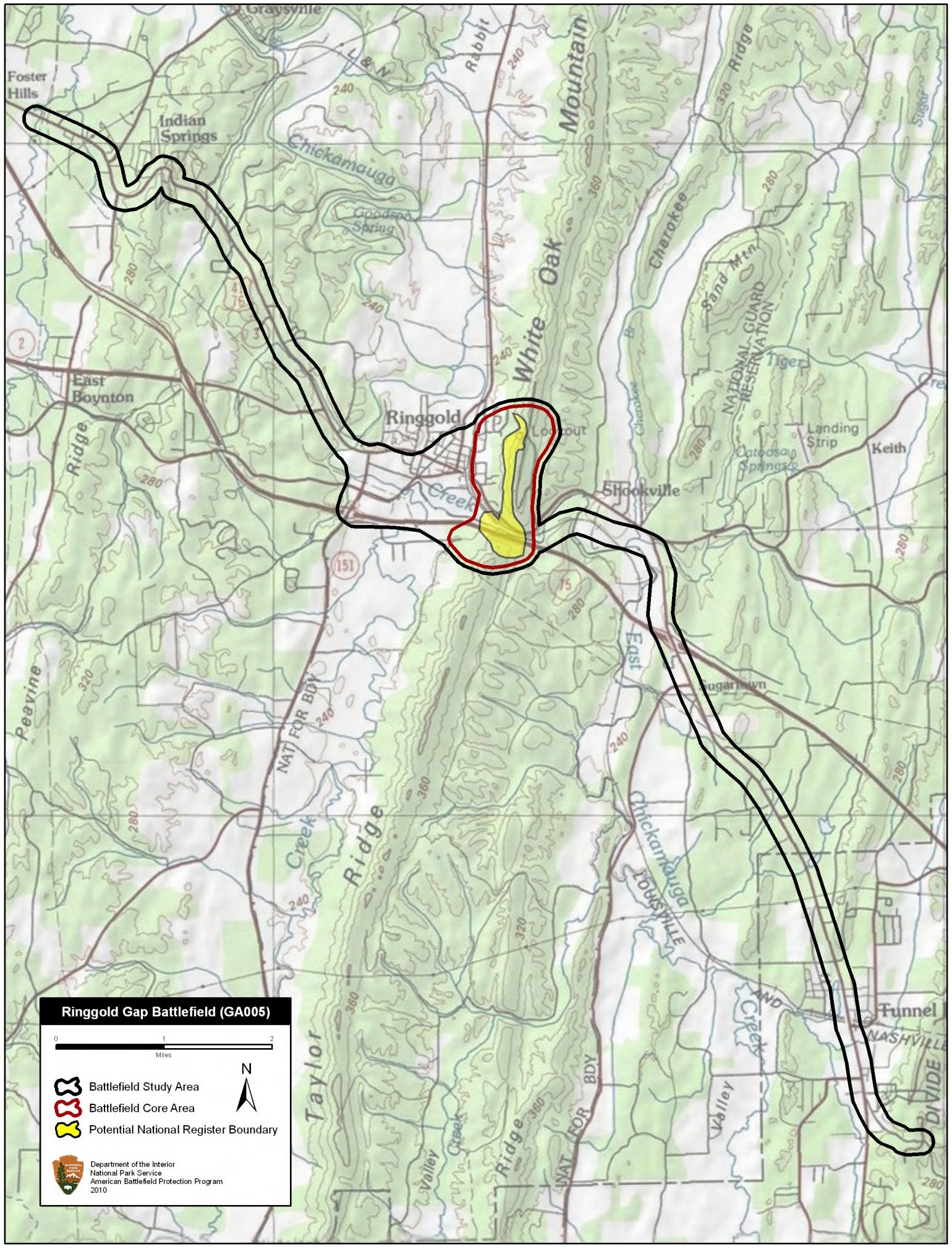
Map of Ringgold Gap Battlefield core and study areas by the American Battlefield Protection Program

Battle of Ringgold, Ga., Nov. 26, 1863 LCCN2004660163

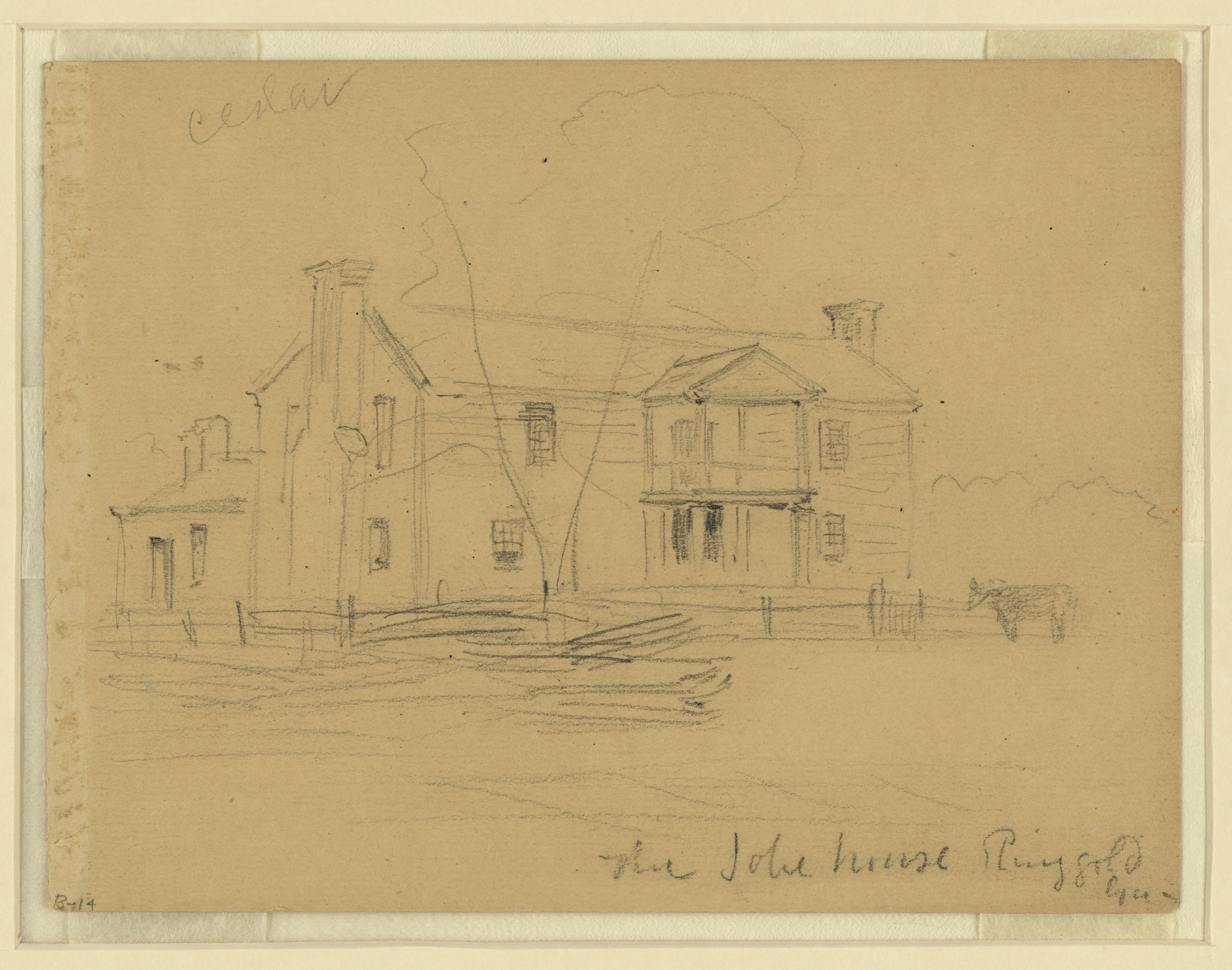
The Jobe house. Ringgold, Ga. LCCN2004660516

== Battlefield today ==
A small park in Ringgold Gap commemorates the battle. A monument to soldiers from New York who sustained heavy casualties stands near Tiger Creek at the Ringgold Water Treatment Plant, while a monument in honor of Major General Patrick Cleburne and his men is located in the park. The nearby Western and Atlantic Depot (Ringgold Depot) still shows scars from the damage it received from artillery fire during the battle. The Ringgold Gap Battlefield was listed on the National Register of Historic Places in 2011.

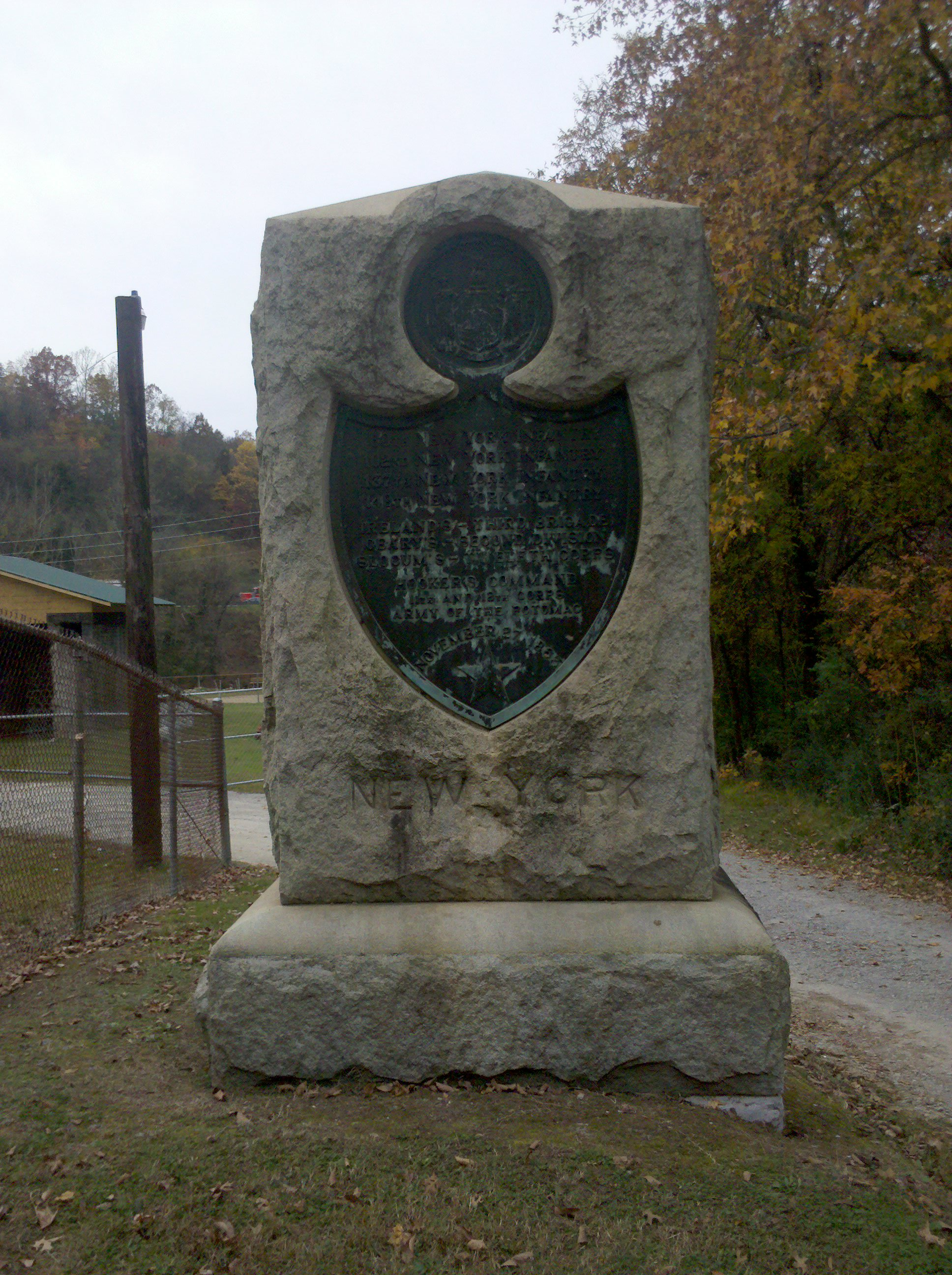
New York Monument

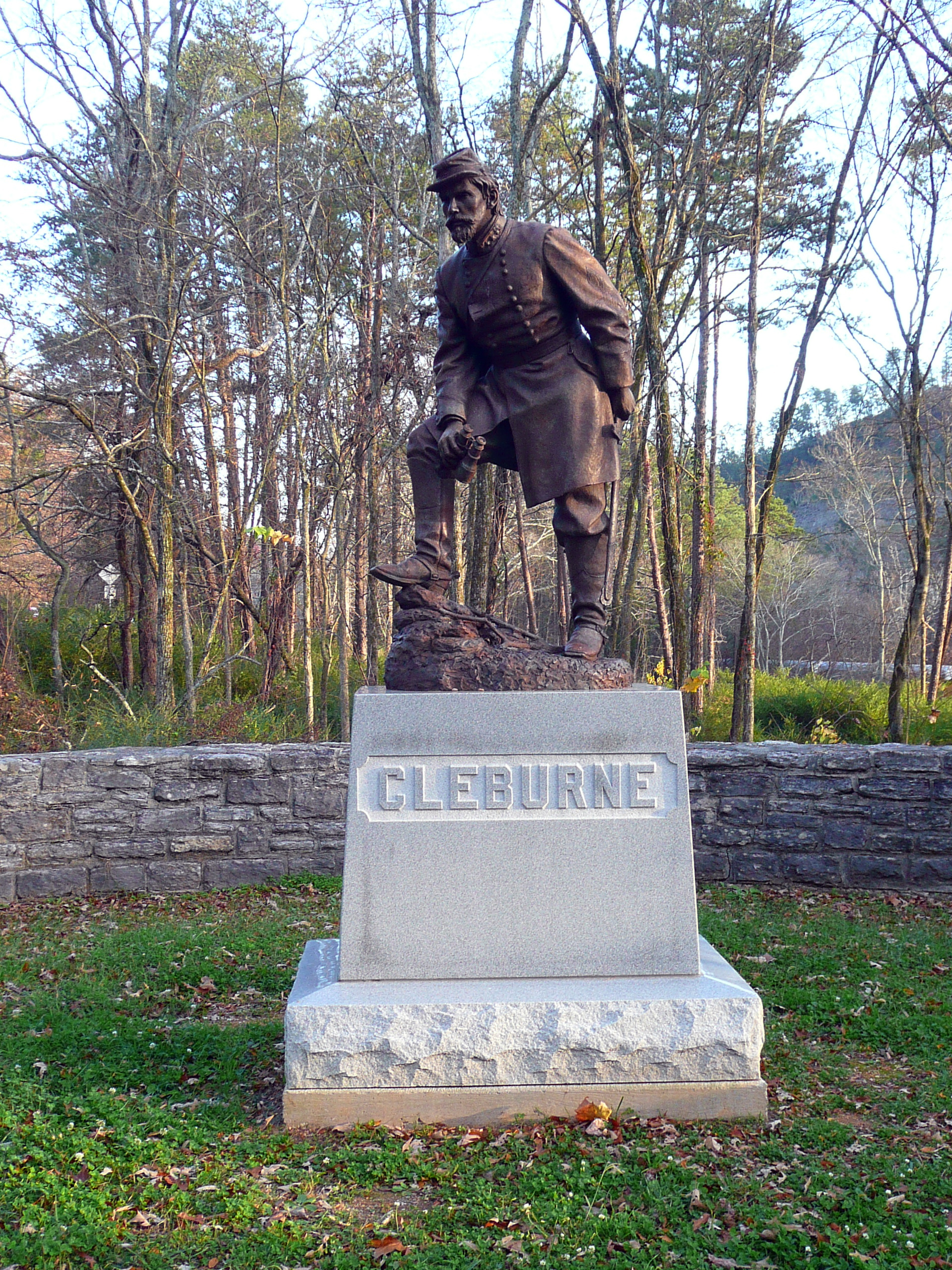
Cleburne's statue at Ringgold Gap, Georgia by sculptor Ron Tunison.

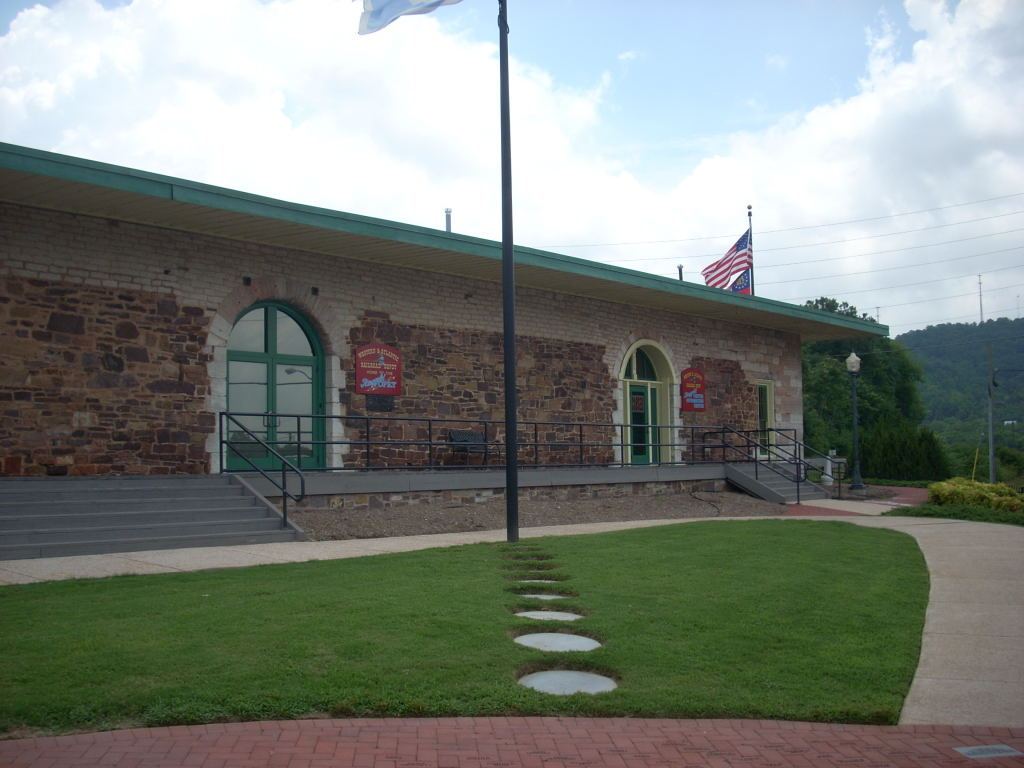
Ringgold Depot, Ringgold (Catoosa County, Georgia)
