= 35th Tennessee Infantry Regiment =

35th Tennessee Infantry Regiment 1st Tennessee Mountain Rifle Regiment 5th (Provisional) Tennessee Infantry Regiment
- Flag of Tennessee
- Active: 1861–1865
- Country: Confederate States of America
- Allegiance: Confederate States Army
- Branch: Army of Tennessee
- Type: Infantry
- Engagements: American Civil War: Shiloh; Murfreesboro; Chickamauga; Chattanooga; Missionary Ridge; Atlanta; Bentonville

Commanders
- Notable commanders: Benjamin Jefferson Hill

The 35th Tennessee Infantry Regiment or Thirty-Fifth Tennessee was an infantry regiment from Tennessee that served with the Confederate States Army in the American Civil War. The unit was disbanded as a result of General Joseph E. Johnston's surrender to General William T. Sherman on April 26, 1865 in Greensboro, North Carolina.

== Organization ==
The 35th Tennessee was organized on September 11, 1861 at Camp Smartt near McMinnville, TN in Warren County.

Originally organized as the 1st Tennessee Mountain Rifle Regiment and then the 5th (Provisional) Tennessee Infantry Regiment. In November, 1861 it was notified to become the 35th Tennessee because another regiment was organized as the 5th Tennessee some four months prior in West Tennessee.

The Regiment consisted of men from these counties in Southeast Middle Tennessee.

- Warren County
- Grundy County
- Van Buren County
- Cannon County
- Sequatchie County
- DeKalb County
- Hamilton County
- Bledsoe County

By the end of the war other units was consolidated with the unit:

48th Tennessee Infantry 57th Tennessee Infantry The units had been decimated and it was only logical to consolidate the units.

== Original Officers ==
Colonel - Benjamin Jefferson Hill
Lt. Colonel - John L. Spurlock
Major/Adjutant - Joseph Brown
Surgeon - Dr. William C. Barnes
Assistant Surgeon - Dr. James M. Bell
Assistant Surgeon- Dr. J.W. Wooten
Quartermaster - Capt. O.F. Brewster
Commissary - Capt. James S. Gribble
Chaplain - Rev. David B. Ritchey
Lt.Sgt - Willem Campbell

== Battles ==
Notable battles fought in include Shiloh and Chickamauga.

== See also ==
- List of Tennessee Confederate Civil War units
