= 6th Texas Infantry Regiment =

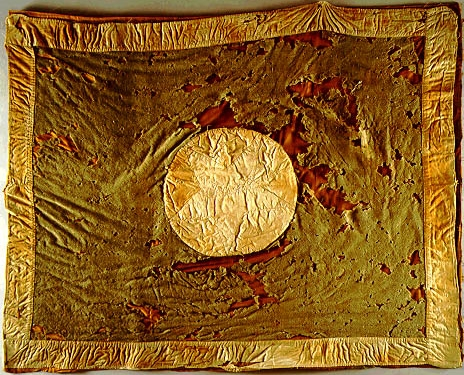
- Flag of the 6th Texas Infantry and the 15th Texas Cavalry (dismounted) Consolidated, Fall 1864
- Active: 1861–1865
- Country: Confederate States of America
- Allegiance: Texas
- Branch: Confederate States Army
- Type: Regiment
- Role: Infantry
- Engagements: American Civil War: Battle of Arkansas Post; Battle of Chickamauga; Battle of Missionary Ridge

Commanders
- Notable commanders: Robert R. Garland

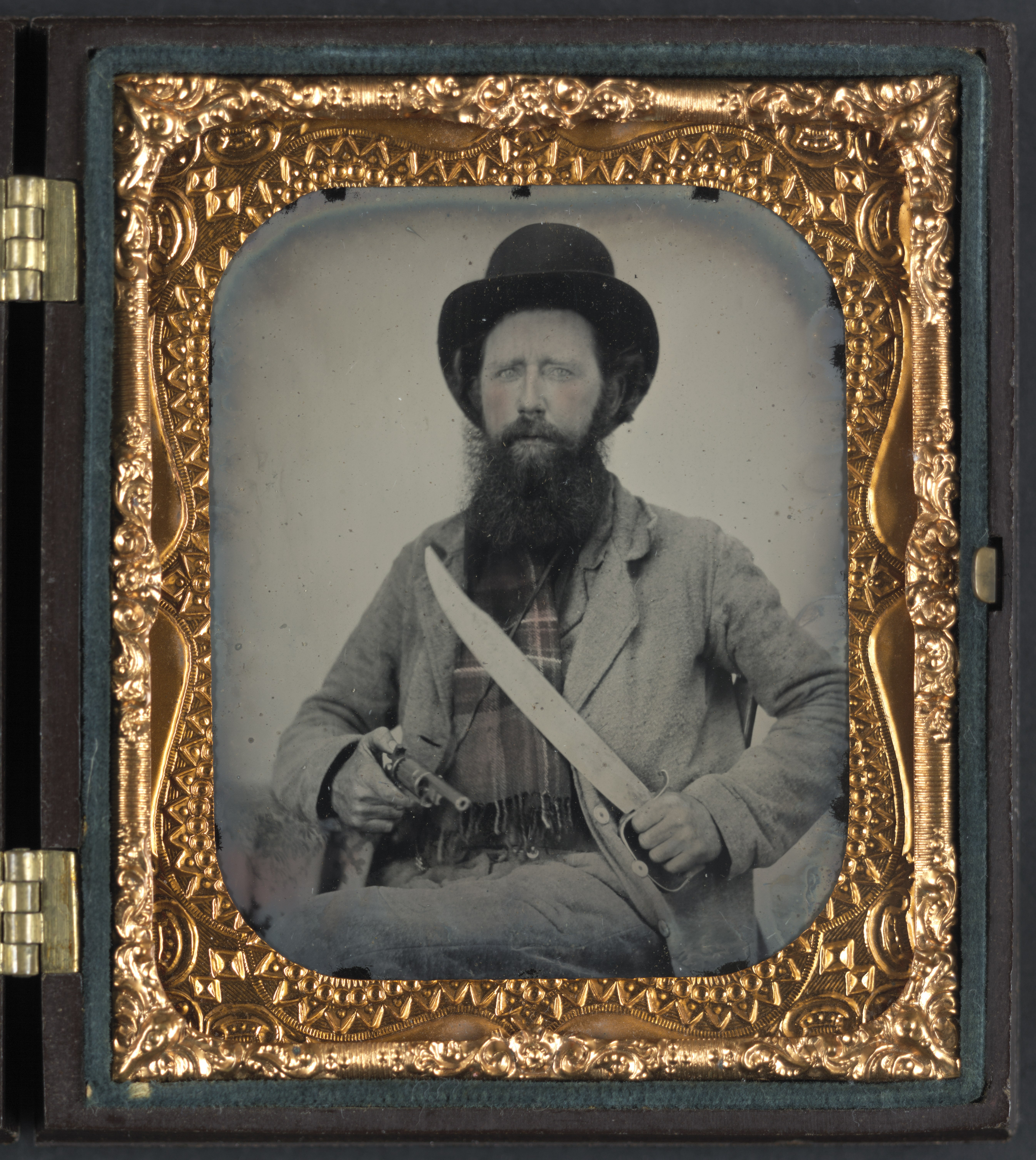
Private Thomas F. Bates of D Company, 6th Texas Infantry

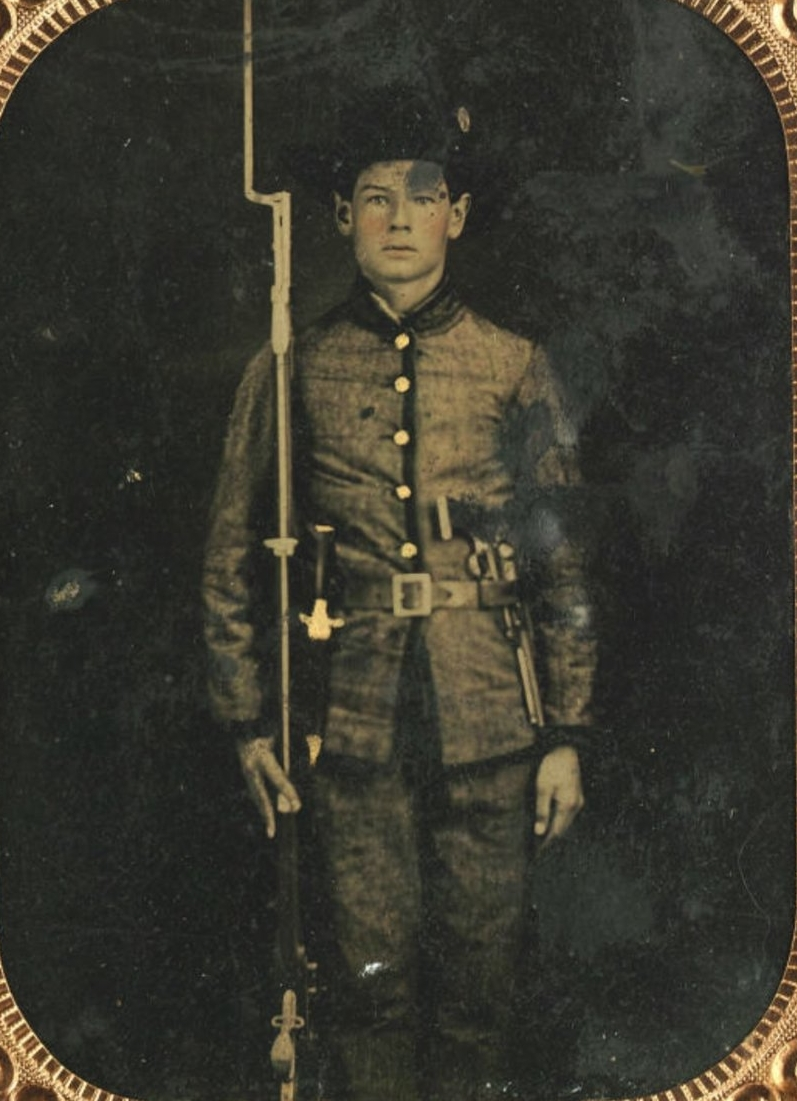
Pvt. William J. Oliphant, Co. G, 6th Texas Infantry

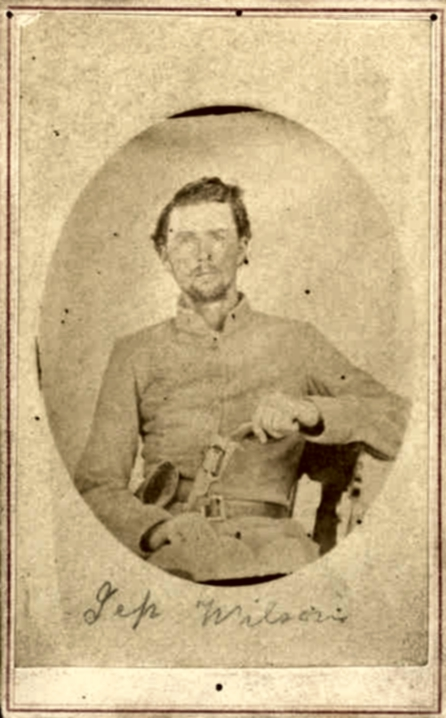
Pvt. Jeptha Wilson, 6th Texas Infantry

The 6th Texas Infantry Regiment was an infantry regiment from Texas that served in the Confederate States Army in the American Civil War. The regiment fought in the Battles of Arkansas Post, Chickamauga and Missionary Ridge.

In September 1861, Major Alexander M. Haskell selected a site four miles north of Victoria, Texas, called "Nuner's Mott" as the location of a new camp of instruction and named it Camp Henry E. McCulloch in honor of the interim commander of the Department of Texas. There, the following companies were ultimately mustered in and designated the Sixth Texas Infantry Regiment.

== Organization ==
=== Companies ===
Company A, "La Vaca Guards" from Calhoun County, was mustered in on September 27, 1861.

Company B, "Lone Star Rifles" from Victoria County, was mustered in on September 30, 1861.

Company C, from Gonzales County, was mustered in on October 4, 1861.

Company D, "Matagorda Coast Guards" was mustered in on October 4, 1861.

Company E, from Guadalupe County, was mustered in on October 30, 1861.

Company F, mostly from Bell County, was mustered in on November 3, 1861.

Company G, "Travis Rifles", from Travis County, was mustered in on November 14, 1861.

Company H, from Calhoun, Lavaca, and Victoria, was mustered in on March 27, 1862.

Company K, from Bexar County, was mustered in on March 31, 1862.

Company I, from DeWitt County, was mustered in on April 11, 1862.

=== Field and Staff ===
Robert R. Garland was appointed by the Confederate Government to take command of the newly created Sixth Texas Infantry Regiment. Garland was a native Virginian who entered the regular army on December 30, 1847, as a second lieutenant in the Seventh Infantry Regiment. By the time Virginia seceded in 1861, he had risen to the rank of Captain and was stationed at Fort Fillmore, New Mexico. Garland was confirmed Colonel on December 12, 1861.

Colonel Robert R. Garland, age 38

Lt. Col. Thomas Scott Anderson, age 34

Major A.M. Haskell

Adj. Samuel J. Garland, age 21

Quartermaster Udolpho Wolfe, age 26

John E. Gare, Assistant Quartermaster

== History ==
Captain Sam W. McCallister, who had been given a commission to raise an infantry company for Confederate service to rendezvous at Camp McCulloch, wrote a letter to General Hebert on November 11, 1861, outlining his difficulty in obtaining Texans to go into infantry companies. "They say they will go mounted, but no other way; that is, a majority say so." He went on to request permission to enlist Federal prisoners that were then at Camp Verde, provided they could get certificates authorizing the Confederate States pay what is due them by the old Government. "They would nearly all to a man join the Southern Army, and there are about 350 of them." General Hebert passed on the request to the Commanding General who refused to comply to it stating "no appropriation had been made for such purpose, and they could not be paid." They could however enlist without back pay (A). This apparently never occurred because Captain McAllister ultimately managed to recruit the majority of his company in San Antonio during the month of March 1862. This company was mustered in as Company K.

The regiment remained at Camp McCulloch drilling recruiting men to achieve an adequate strength until the latter part of May 1862. During this period, in December 1861, a federal vessel in Pass Cavallo was sighted and four companies of the regiment, Companies A, B, D, and G were dispatched to meet this possible threat. Captain Rupley's Company A was ordered by Col. Garland to take position at Saluria, to guard the ferry across the main bayou and to afford any other assistance as necessary. The other three companies, under Lieutenant Colonel Anderson, took position at Indianola (B) where, according to Jim Turner of Company G "the men feasted on fish and oysters and had a good time generally" (C). Later on February 6, 1862, another concern of federal movements caused Companies A and D to be sent to Fort Esperanza, near Saluria, for a brief period.

Jim Turner in his memoirs, wrote the following about Colonel Robert Garland: "Our colonel was an old army officer and having spent twenty five years in the regular army, was a perfect martinet and everything had to be done in strict accordance with military rules. He kept us hard at work drilling and converted the regiment into a machine which would move with clock-like precision".(C)

During their stay at Camp McCulloch, the soldiers were furnished with new uniforms made of light brown cloth manufactured at the state penitentiary. The men were furnished with new Springfields or Enfield Rifles and Accoutrements. The regiment also procured a large number of wagons, tents and supplies.

May – September 1862 – On May 22, 1862, the regiment took up the line of march, passing through Hallettsville, and then halting for a week at Eagle Lake, where there were a depot and four or five houses. During the march, at a pace of about ten miles a day, the regimental musicians performed as the troops passed through the towns. At the Eagle Lake Depot, the soldiers boarded the railroad cars on June 6, and went through Richmond, Houston, and Navasota, the wagon train traveling by road. During the encampment at Navasota, a member of the regiment stole a revolver that belonged to Captain C.F. Naunheim, Commanding Company I. The man was caught when he attempted to sell the pistol on the same day it was taken. The soldier was tried, convicted and drummed out of service, with his head half-shaved and astride a fence rail carried by blacks, as his former comrades lined the street and watched.

After three days at Navasota, the route then lay, in easy marches never traveling more than 20 miles a day and generally much less, through Anderson, Crockett, Mount Vernon, and Tyler where it remained five to seven days, then on to Dangerfield, and Gilmer. (C,1) The 6th Regt. crossed the Sulphur River into Bowie County at Epperson's Ferry south of current day New Boston on July 12, 1862. Ferriage was paid at the time of crossing.

In mid July the regiment crossed the Red River at Fulton (2) where Texarkana now lies (C), passed through Washington and Antwine, and halted at a place near the old village of Rock Port, where Malvern now stands. Here an outbreak of measles incapacitated many of the soldiers (1).

By the time the Sixth Texas had crossed into Arkansas, its regimental flag arrived from Victoria. The standard was produced by Mrs. Richard Owens and her daughters.... she procured the necessary supplies and produce a banner made of red merino, bordered with a white silk fringe. Located in the center was a 28 by 36 inch blue shield which contained twelve silk or satin white stars that circled, six on each side, a large star that represented the State of Texas. Stitched in white silk was "Sixth Texas Infantry Regiment" (1, pg 8)

"Day after day we march in the woods and God knows if we will come out again," wrote Private Franz Coller. "I have never seen such a poor region as we see out here in east Texas and Arkansas." After a rest of ten days, the regiment marched to Benton, camped on the Saline River two miles from town for two weeks, and then started for Pine Bluff, leaving a number of men in the hospital there with measles. After arriving at Pine Bluff, the regiment went into camp at Camp Holmes (2).

September 1862 – General Holmes ordered the Sixth Texas Infantry and the Twenty-Fourth and Twenty-Fifth Cavalry (dismounted) to Arkansas Post, a community 117 miles below Little Rock and twenty-five miles from the mouth of the Arkansas River. The town was selected as a site for the construction of a Confederate fort that was deemed necessary to help defend the Arkansas River. The Sixth and Twenty-fourth marched together leisurely down the Arkansas River until they reached the Jourdan plantation eighteen miles above the Post. September 18 – Early in the evening a courier brought work that the Federals were advancing to destroy the fortifications. (Jim Turner) 400 volunteers from both regiments agreed to proceed on to the Post. They left after dark and traveled across fields and took small trails and paths.

September 19, 1862 – The 400 volunteers of both Regiments arrives at Arkansas Post at sunrise where they did not find any enemy. (from One of Cleburne's Command, pg3)

September 21, 1862 – The remainder of the sixth and twenty fourth regiments arrive at Arkansas Post.(")

September 28, 1862 – Reorganization of the Confederate Army in Northwestern Arkansas, southwestern Missouri and the Indian Territory occurs and Major General Thomas C. Hindman was placed in charge of the First Army Corps, Army of the West. The Sixth Texas became part of the First Army Corps' First Brigade. Garland was given command of the brigade and Lieutenant Colonel T. Scott Anderson assumes command of the Sixth Texas.(Diary of Charles Leuschner, pg 9 – O.R., Series I, Vol. XII, 883–885.)

October – November 1862 – The regiment worked to complete the fortifications at the Post. In November an abundance of supplies begun to arrive at the Post, shoes, woolen clothe, blankets and commissary goods were sent from Little Rock to the Post. (D.C.L., pg 10)

=== Battle of Arkansas Post ===
Battle of Arkansas Post, January 10–11, 1863.

Two Brigades: Deshler's Brigade and Garland's Brigade.

January 9, 1863 – Confederate pickets in the morning detect the Federal Advance upon the Post. Each soldier was directed to cook three days rations. Garland's Brigade were assigned to the rifle pits which were located about a mile and a half from the fort. Five companies from the Twenty-Fourth and Sixth Texas were detailed as skirmishers. One of the companies in the Sixth was Company A.

January 10, 1863 – At about 8:00 am, Admiral David D. Porter's gunboats began shelling the Confederate positions in a systematic fashion. By 2:00 in the afternoon, the Confederates were forced to withdraw from the rifle pits to safer confines, a ditch near the fort. Five companies of the Tenth Texas were detached to help Col Garland's five companies of skirmishers cover the withdrawal. The Sixth Texas assumed a position on the right of the line, next to the fort. Garland instructed the troops to strengthen their defenses with brush and any other material that could be found. The weather turned cold and frosty at dusk, and the Yankees commenced a three-hour bombardment on the fort and the entrenched Confederates. The shelling ceased about 9:30 pm.(3,6)

January 11, 1863 – Porter's ships commenced to shell the fort by noon and shortly thereafter, McClernard's Yankees sprang forward from the trees and bushes toward the entrenchments of the Sixth Texas. The Sixth were armed with Enfield Rifles. T. Scott Anderson commanded the left wing of the regiment and Alexander H. Phillips directed the right wing. The Texans repulsed every enemy ground assault, but by 3:00 pm all the guns but one were silenced in the fort by the relentless cannonading of the Yankee gunboats. Despite the loss of the Confederate artillery, fighting continued along the entire defensive line. The firing on the Confederate left had been heavy since the beginning and Colonel James Deshler called upon Garland for assistance. Garland honored the request by dispatching selected companies from the Brigade's three regiments, two coming from the Sixth Texas (3). Alexander H. Phillips led the companies that represented the Sixth Texas. Enemy fire was so intense that the reinforcements were compelled to crawl the entire distance to their destination. Phillips and his men stopped along the way and assisted different commands to repulse Federal assaults. Prior to reaching Deshler's position, two companies of the Sixth Texas were recalled by Garland. Shortly after the reinforcements reached Deshler, about 4:30 P.M., fighting ceased with the capitulation of the Confederate defenders. (3,6)

Precisely who initiated the surrender is not known. Colonel Garland and General Churchill reported that the white flags first appeared in the 24th Texas Cavalry Regiment. Col. Garland also reported that as the word was being passed down the line towards the fort from the left of the sixth and as he was standing on the left of the sixth, this regiment refused to raise the white flag and pass it on down the line to the fort. The firing had ceased on the left but the right continued to receive fire from the enemies batteries until they took possession of the fort. (3,6)

"The first intelligible thing is some one on our left, cries out 'Hoist the white flag on the fort, pass the word down the line' – The same words were passed to the next company on our right towards the Fort" wrote Capt. Samuel T. Foster (One of C.C.) In a few minutes the Confederate flag is pulled down and a white flag run up on the flag staff in the fort, and white handkerchiefs or shirt tails are hoisted on ramrods and on guns all along the line. The strength of the Sixth Texas on January 9 was reported to be 542 officers and enlisted men. The total number of casualties suffered by the Sixth Texas during the entire battle as reported by Col. Garland was 8 killed, 24 wounded and 21 missing or 10%. The entire command suffering only 28 killed, 81 wounded and 68 missing or 177 out of approximately 3,350 men engaged. The Union forces reported 134 men killed, 898 wounded and 29 missing for a total of 1,061 casualties. (6)

The prisoners were ordered to stack arms and then marched to the rear of the line to the bank of the river above the fort and guards placed around them. Most of the Confederate soldiers left their blankets, quilts, and extra clothing in the log huts, and were not permitted to retrieve them. Without proper winter attire, they were ill-prepared to travel northward to prison camps in the middle of winter.

January 12–30, 1863 – The prisoners are processed and boarded steamboats. Rain began to fall and as they made their way north the rain turned to snow and the men suffered terribly from the cold. The steamboats made their way to the Mississippi River and ascended it, stopping at Memphis for a couple of days. From Memphis, the ships went to Cairo, Illinois, then to St. Louis.

=== Battle of Missionary Ridge ===
In November 1863 the regiment was consolidated into what became known as "Granbury's Texas Brigade." On November 24–25, 1863 the regiment held the northern end of the ridge where they protected the Confederate flank from 20,000 advancing Union forces.

== See also ==
- Texas Civil War Confederate Units
