= Battle of Stones River order of battle: Confederate =

The following Confederate States Army units and commanders fought in the Battle of Stones River of the American Civil War. The Union order of battle is listed separately. Order of battle compiled from the army organization during the campaign, the casualty returns and the reports.

== Abbreviations used ==
=== Military rank ===
- Gen = General
- LTG = Lieutenant General
- MG = Major General
- BG = Brigadier General
- Col = Colonel
- Ltc = Lieutenant Colonel
- Maj = Major
- Cpt = Captain
- Lt = Lieutenant

=== Other ===
- (w) = wounded
- (mw) = mortally wounded
- (k) = killed
- (c) = captured

== Army of Tennessee ==
Gen Braxton Bragg, Commanding

=== Polk's Corps ===
LTG Leonidas Polk

Division	Brigade	Regiments and Others
Cheatham's Division; MG Benjamin F. Cheatham	First (Donelson's) Brigade BG Daniel S. Donelson	8th Tennessee: Col William L. Moore (k), Ltc John H. Anderson; 16th Tennessee: Col John H. Savage; 38th Tennessee: Col John C. Carter; 51st Tennessee: Col John Chester; 84th Tennessee: Col Sidney S. Stanton; Carnes' (Tennessee) battery: Cpt William W. Carnes
Cheatham's Division; MG Benjamin F. Cheatham	Second (Stewart's) Brigade BG Alexander P. Stewart	4th-5th Tennessee: Col Otho F. Strahl; 19th Tennessee: Col Francis M. Walker; 24th Tennessee: Col Hugh L. W. Bratton (mw), Maj Samuel E. Shannon; 31st-33rd Tennessee: Col Egbert E. Tansil; Stanford's (Mississippi) battery: Cpt Thomas J. Stanford
Cheatham's Division; MG Benjamin F. Cheatham	Third (Maney's) Brigade BG George Maney	1st-27th Tennessee: Col Hume R. Field; 4th Tennessee (Provisional Army): Col James A. McMurry; 6th-9th Tennessee: Col Charles S. Hurt, Maj John L. Harris; Maney's company (Tennessee) Sharpshooters: Cpt Frank Maney; Smith's (Mississippi) battery: Lt William B. Turner
Cheatham's Division; MG Benjamin F. Cheatham	Fourth (Smith's) Brigade Col Alfred J. Vaughan, Jr. BG Preston Smith	12th Tennessee: Maj Josiah N. Wyatt; 13th Tennessee: Ltc William E. Morgan (mw), Cpt R. F. Lanier; 29th Tennessee: Maj John B. Johnson; 47th Tennessee: Cpt William M. Watkins; 154th Senior Tennessee: Ltc Michael Magevney, Jr.; 9th Texas: Col William H. Young; Allin's (Tennessee) Sharpshooters: Lt J. R. J. Creighton (mw), Lt T. F. Pattison; Scott's (Tennessee) battery: Cpt William L. Scott
Withers' Division; MG Jones M. Withers	First (Deas') Brigade Col John Q. Loomis (w); Col John G. Coltart	19th Alabama; 22nd Alabama; 25th Alabama; 26th Alabama: Col John G. Coltart; 39th Alabama; 17th Alabama Battalion Sharpshooters: Cpt Benjamin C. Yancey; 1st Louisiana (Regulars): Ltc Frederick H. Farrar, Jr. (mw); Robertson's (Florida) battery: Cpt Felix H. Robertson
Withers' Division; MG Jones M. Withers	Second (Chalmers') Brigade BG James R. Chalmers (w); Col Thomas W. White	7th Mississippi; 9th Mississippi: Col Thomas W. White; 10th Mississippi; 41st Mississippi; 9th Mississippi Battalion Sharpshooters: Cpt O. F. West; Blythe's (Mississippi) regiment; Garrity's (Alabama) battery
Withers' Division; MG Jones M. Withers	Third (Walthall's) Brigade BG J. Patton Anderson	45th Alabama: Col James G. Gilchrist; 24th Mississippi: Ltc Robert P. McKelvaine; 27th Mississippi: Col Thomas M. Jones, Ltc James L. Autry (k), Cpt Edward R. Neilson (w); 29th Mississippi: Col William F. Brantley (w), Ltc James B. Morgan; 30th Mississippi: Ltc Junius I. Scales; 39th North Carolina: Cpt Alfred W. Bell; Barret's (Missouri) battery: Cpt O. W. Barret
Withers' Division; MG Jones M. Withers	Fourth (Anderson's) Brigade Col Arthur M. Manigault	24th Alabama; 28th Alabama; 34th Alabama; 10th-19th South Carolina: Col Augustus J. Lythgoe (k); Waters' (Alabama) battery: Cpt David D. Waters

=== Hardee's Corps ===
LTG William J. Hardee

Division	Brigade	Regiments and Others
Breckinridge's Division; MG John C. Breckinridge	First (Adams') Brigade BG Daniel W. Adams (w); Col Randall L. Gibson	32nd Alabama: Ltc Henry Maury (w), Col Alexander McKinstry; 13th-20th Louisiana: Col Randall L. Gibson, Maj Charles Guillet; 16th-25th Louisiana: Col Stewart W. Fisk (k), Maj Francis C. Zacharie; 14th Louisiana Battalion Sharpshooters: Maj John E. Austin; Washington Artillery, Fifth Company: Lt William C. D. Vaught
Breckinridge's Division; MG John C. Breckinridge	Second (Pillow's) Brigade Col Joseph B. Palmer; BG Gideon J. Pillow	18th Tennessee: Ltc William R. Butler, Col Joseph B. Palmer (w); 26th Tennessee: Col John M. Lillard; 28th Tennessee: Col Preston D. Cunningham (k); 45th Tennessee: Col Anderson Searcy; Moses' (Georgia) battery: Lt Ruel W. Anderson
Breckinridge's Division; MG John C. Breckinridge	Third (Preston's) Brigade BG William Preston	1st-3rd Florida: Col William Miller (w); 4th Florida: Col William L. L. Bowen; 60th North Carolina: Col Joseph A. McDowell; 20th Tennessee: Col Thomas B. Smith (w), Ltc Frank M. Lavender, Maj Fred Claybrooke; Wright's (Tennessee) Battery: Cpt E. Eldridge Wright (k), Lt John W. Mebane (w)
Breckinridge's Division; MG John C. Breckinridge	Fourth (Hanson's) Brigade BG Roger W. Hanson (mw); Col Robert P. Trabue	41st Alabama: Ltc Martin L. Stansel (w); 2nd Kentucky: Maj James W. Hewitt (w), Cpt James W. Moss; 4th Kentucky: Col Robert P. Trabue, Cpt Thomas W. Thompson; 6th Kentucky: Col Joseph H. Lewis; 9th Kentucky: Col Thomas H. Hunt; Cobb's (Kentucky) Battery: Cpt Robert Cobb
Breckinridge's Division; MG John C. Breckinridge	Jackson's Brigade BG John K. Jackson	5th Georgia: Col William T. Black (k), Maj Charles P. Daniel; 2nd Georgia Battalion Sharpshooters: Maj Jesse J. Cox; 5th Mississippi: Ltc Walter L. Sykes (w); 8th Mississippi: Col John C. Wilkinson (w&c), Ltc Aden McNeill; Pritchard's (Georgia) Battery; Lumsden's (Alabama) battery: Lt Harvey H. Cribbs
Cleburne's Division; MG Patrick R. Cleburne	First (Polk's) Brigade BG Lucius E. Polk	1st Arkansas: Col John W. Colquitt; 13th-15th Arkansas: Maj Charles H. Carlton (w), Maj Robert A. Duncan (w); 5th Confederate: Col James A. Smith; 2nd Tennessee: Col William D. Robison; 35th Tennessee: Col Benjamin J. Hill; Helena (Arkansas) Artillery: Lt Thomas J. Key
Cleburne's Division; MG Patrick R. Cleburne	Second (Liddell's) Brigade BG St. John R. Liddell	2nd Arkansas: Col Daniel C. Govan; 5th Arkansas: Ltc John E. Murray; 6th-7th Arkansas: Col Samuel G. Smith (w), Ltc F. J. Cameron (w), Maj William F. Douglass; 8th Arkansas: Col John H. Kelly (w), Ltc George F. Baucum; Swett's (Mississippi) battery: Lt Harvey Shannon
Cleburne's Division; MG Patrick R. Cleburne	Third (Johnson's) Brigade BG Bushrod R. Johnson	17th Tennessee: Col Albert S. Marks (w), Ltc Watt W. Floyd; 23rd Tennessee: Ltc Richard H. Keeble; 25th Tennessee: Col John M. Hughs (w), Ltc Samuel Davis; 37th Tennessee: Col Moses White (w), Maj Joseph T. McReynolds (k), Cpt Charles G. Jarnagin; 44th Tennessee: Col John S. Fulton; Jefferson (Mississippi) Artillery: Cpt Putnam Darden
Cleburne's Division; MG Patrick R. Cleburne	Fourth (Wood's) Brigade BG Sterling A. M. Wood	16th Alabama: Col William B. Wood (w); 33rd Alabama: Col Samuel Adams; 3rd Confederate: Maj John F. Cameron; 45th Mississippi: Ltc Richard Charlton; 15th Mississippi Battalion Sharpshooters: Cpt A. T. Hawkins; Semple's (Alabama) Battery: Cpt Henry C. Semple
McCown's Division; MG John P. McCown	First (Ector's) Brigade BG Mathew D. Ector	10th Texas Cavalry (dismounted): Col Matthew F. Locke; 11th Texas Cavalry (dismounted): Col John C. Burks (mw), Ltc Joseph M. Bounds; 14th Texas Cavalry (dismounted): Col John L. Camp; 32nd (15th) Texas Cavalry (dismounted): Col Julius A. Andrews; Douglas's Texas Battery: Cpt James P. Douglas
McCown's Division; MG John P. McCown	Second (Rains's) Brigade BG James E. Rains (k); Col Robert B. Vance	3rd Georgia Battalion: Ltc Marcellus A. Stovall; 9th Georgia Battalion: Maj Joseph T. Smith; 29th North Carolina: Col Robert B. Vance; 11th Tennessee: Col George W. Gordon (w), Ltc William Thedford; Eufaula (Alabama) Light Artillery: Lt William A. McDuffie
McCown's Division; MG John P. McCown	Third (McNair's) Brigade BG Evander McNair; Col Robert W. Harper	1st Arkansas Mounted Rifles (dismounted): Col Robert W. Harper, Maj Lee M. Ramsaur (w); 2nd Arkansas Mounted Rifles (dismounted): Ltc James A. Williamson; 4th Arkansas: Col Henry G. Bunn; 30th (25th) Arkansas: Maj James J. Franklin (w&c), Cpt William A. Cotter; 4th Arkansas Battalion: Maj Jesse A. Ross; Humphreys' (Arkansas) Battery: Cpt John T. Humphreys

=== Cavalry ===
Division	Brigade	Regiments and Others
Cavalry; BG Joseph Wheeler	Wheeler's Brigade BG Joseph Wheeler	1st Alabama: Col William W. Allen (w); 3rd Alabama: Maj Francis Y. Gaines, Cpt Tyirie H. Mauldin; 51st Alabama: Col John T. Morgan, Ltc James D. Webb (w); 8th Confederate: Col William B. Wade; 1st Tennessee: Col James E. Carter; Douglass' (Tennessee) Battalion: Maj DeWitt C. Douglass; Holman's (Tennessee) Battalion: Maj Daniel W. Holman; Wiggins' (Arkansas) Battery: Cpt Jannedens H. Wiggins
Cavalry; BG Joseph Wheeler	Buford's Brigade BG Abraham Buford	3rd Kentucky: Col J. Russell Butler; 5th Kentucky: Col D. H. Smith; 6th Kentucky: Col John W. Grigsby
Cavalry; BG Joseph Wheeler	Pegram's Brigade BG John Pegram	1st Georgia; 1st Louisiana
Cavalry; BG Joseph Wheeler	Wharton's Brigade BG John A. Wharton	14th Alabama Battalion: Ltc James C. Malone; 1st Confederate: Col John T. Cox; 3rd Confederate: Ltc William N. Estes; 2nd Georgia: Ltc James E. Dunlop, Maj Francis M. Ison; 3rd Georgia (detachment): Maj Robert Thompson; 2nd Tennessee: Col Henry M. Ashby; 4th Tennessee: Col Baxter Smith; Davis' (Tennessee) Battalion: Maj John R. Davis; 8th Texas: Col Thomas Harrison; Murray's (Tennessee) regiment: Maj William S. Bledsoe; Escort company: Cpt Paul F. Anderson; McCown's escort company: Cpt L. T. Hardy; White's (Tennessee) battery: Cpt Benjamin F. White, Jr.

=== Artillery ===
Battalions	Batteries
Artillery	Baxter's (Tennessee) battery; Byrne's (Kentucky) battery; Gibson's (Georgia) battery
