= Battle of Perryville order of battle: Confederate =

The following Confederate Army units and commanders fought in the Battle of Perryville of the American Civil War. The Union order of battle is listed separately.

== Abbreviations used ==
=== Military rank ===
- Gen = General
- MG = Major General
- BG = Brigadier General
- Col = Colonel
- Ltc = Lieutenant Colonel
- Maj = Major
- Cpt = Captain
- Lt = 1st Lieutenant
- 2Lt = 2nd Lieutenant

=== Artillery ===
- 3" R = 3 inch caliber ordnance rifle
- How = Howitzer
- Nap = M1857 Napoleon gun
- pdr = pound (projectile weight)
- R = Rifled gun
- SB = Smoothbore gun

=== Other ===
- w = wounded
- mw = mortally wounded
- k = killed

== Army of Mississippi ==
16,000 men, 56 guns (k-532, w-2652, m-236 = 3,420)

Gen Braxton Bragg, Commanding

Escort:

- 3rd Tennessee Cavalry (4 companies): Cpt W. C. Bacot

k-1, w-0, m-0 = 1

- 13th Battalion Tennessee Cavalry, Company I: Cpt William W. Lillard

=== Right Wing ===
7,000 men, 16 guns (k-306, w-1153, m-87 = 1,546)

MG Leonidas Polk

Escort:

- Orleans Light Horse Company: Cpt Leeds Greenleaf

Division	Brigade	Regiments and Others
First Division; 16 guns, k-305, w-1153, m-87 = 1,545 MG Benjamin Franklin Cheatham	1st Brigade k-71, w-300, m-3 = 374 BG Daniel Smith Donelson	8th Tennessee: Col William Lawson Moore; 15th Tennessee: Col Robert Charles Tyler; 16th Tennessee: Col John Houston Savage (w); 38th Tennessee: Col John Carpenter Carter (w); 51st Tennessee (Consolidated): Col John Chester; Carnes' Battery (aka The Steuben Artillery) (Tennessee) [4 6-pdr SB]: Cpt William Watts Carnes
First Division; 16 guns, k-305, w-1153, m-87 = 1,545 MG Benjamin Franklin Cheatham	2nd Brigade k-62, w-336, m-25 = 423 BG Alexander Peter Stewart	4th Tennessee: Col Otho French Strahl; 5th Tennessee & 46th Tennessee, Company L: Col Calvin Davenport Venable (w); 24th Tennessee: Ltc Hugh L. W. Bratton; 31st Tennessee: Col Erasmus Egbert Tansil; 33rd Tennessee: Col Warner P. Jones; Stanford's Battery (Mississippi) [4 3" R]: Cpt Thomas Jefferson Stanford
First Division; 16 guns, k-305, w-1153, m-87 = 1,545 MG Benjamin Franklin Cheatham	3rd Brigade k-107, w-515, m-58 = 743 BG George Earl Maney	41st Georgia: Col Charles Addison McDaniel (mw); 1st Tennessee: Col Hume R. Field; 6th Tennessee: Col George Camp Porter; 9th Tennessee: Ltc John W. Buford (w); 27th Tennessee: Ltc William Frierson (w), Maj Alexander C. Allen; Turner's Battery (aka Smith's Battery) (Mississippi) [2 12-pdr How, 2 6-pdr iron SB]: Lt William B. Turner
First Division; 16 guns, k-305, w-1153, m-87 = 1,545 MG Benjamin Franklin Cheatham	4th Brigade k-2, w-2, m-1 = 5 BG Preston Smith	12th Tennessee: Col Tyree Harris Bell; 13th Tennessee: Col Alfred Jefferson Vaughan Jr.; 47th Tennessee: Col Munson R. Hill; 154th (Senior) Tennessee: Col Michael Magevney, Jr.; 9th Texas: Col William Hugh Young; Scott's Battery (aka Blankhead's Battery) (Tennessee) [2 6-pdr SB, 2 12-pdr How]: Cpt William L. Scott
First Division; 16 guns, k-305, w-1153, m-87 = 1,545 MG Benjamin Franklin Cheatham	1st Cavalry Brigade k-1, w-2, m-0 = 3 Col John Austin Wharton	2nd Georgia Cavalry (5 companies): Ltc Arthur Hood; 1st Kentucky Cavalry (Companies C, D, I, & K): Cpt Thomas A. Ireland; 4th Tennessee Cavalry (5 companies): Maj Baxter Smith; Davis' Cavalry Battalion (4 companies) (Tennessee): Maj John R. Davis; 8th Texas Cavalry (aka Terry's Texas Rangers): Ltc Thomas Harrison

=== Left Wing ===
9,000 men, 40 guns (k-225, w-1499, m-149 = 1,873)

MG William Joseph Hardee

Escort:

- Raum's Cavalry Company (Mississippi): Cpt William Cyrus Rippey Raum

Division	Brigade	Regiments and Others
Second Division; 18 guns, k-109, w-406, m-70 = 585 BG James Patton Anderson	1st Brigade k-47, w-190, m-2 = 239 BG John Calvin Brown (w)	1st Florida: Col William Miller; 3rd Florida: Col Daniel B. Bird; 41st Mississippi: Col William Feimster Tucker (w); 14th Georgia Battalion Light Artillery, Battery "A" [3 12-pdr How, 3 6-pdr SB]: Cpt Joseph Palmer
Second Division; 18 guns, k-109, w-406, m-70 = 585 BG James Patton Anderson	2nd Brigade k-7, w-78, m-67 = 152 BG Daniel Weisiger Adams	13th Louisiana: Col Randall Lee Gibson; Austin's Battalion, Sharpshooters (aka 14th Battalion): Maj John Edward Austin; 16th Louisiana: Col Daniel C. Gober; 20th Louisiana: Col August Reichard; 25th Louisiana: Col Stewart W. Fisk; 5th Company, Washington Artillery (Louisiana) [2 6-pdr SB, 2 3" R, 2 12-pdr How] : Cpt Cuthbert Harrison Slocomb
Second Division; 18 guns, k-109, w-406, m-70 = 585 BG James Patton Anderson	3rd Brigade k-13, w-13, m-0 = 26 Col Samuel Powel	45th Alabama: Col James Graham Gilchrist; 1st Arkansas: Col John W. Colquitt; 24th Mississippi: Col William Frances Dowd; 29th Tennessee: Col Horace Rice; Barret's Battery (Missouri) [2 6-pdr SB, 2 12-pdr How]: Cpt Overton W. Barret
Second Division; 18 guns, k-109, w-406, m-70 = 585 BG James Patton Anderson	4th Brigade k-42, w-125, m-1 = 168 Col Thomas Marshall Jones	27th Mississippi: Ltc James Lockhart Autry; 30th Mississippi: Col George G. Falls Neill; 34th Mississippi: Col Samuel Benton (w); 2nd Alabama Battalion Light Artillery, Battery "F" [4 12-pdr Nap]: Cpt Charles L. Lumsden
Third Division; 20 guns, k-113, w-709, m-10 = 832 MG Simon Bolivar Buckner	1st Brigade k-15, w-57, m-0 = 72 BG St. John Richardson Liddell	2nd Arkansas: Col Daniel Govan; 5th Arkansas: Col Lucius P. Featherston; 6th Arkansas: Col Alexander T. Hawthorn; 7th Arkansas: Col David A. Gillispie; 8th Arkansas: Col John Herbert Kelly; Swett's Battery (Mississippi) [4 6-pdr SB, 2 12-pdr How]: 2Lt Thomas Havern
Third Division; 20 guns, k-113, w-709, m-10 = 832 MG Simon Bolivar Buckner	2nd Brigade k-25, w-325, m-0 = 350 BG Patrick Ronayne Cleburne	13th Arkansas/15th Arkansas: Col Lucius Eugene Polk (w); 2nd Tennessee: Cpt Charles P. Moore; 35th Tennessee: Col Benjamin Jefferson Hill; 48th Tennessee: Col George Henry Nixon; Calvert's Battery (Arkansas) [2 sections; 2 12-pdr How, 2 6-pdr SB]: 2Lt Thomas J. Key
Third Division; 20 guns, k-113, w-709, m-10 = 832 MG Simon Bolivar Buckner	3rd Brigade k-32, w-164, m-9 = 205 BG Bushrod Rust Johnson	5th Confederate (8 companies): Col James A. Smith; 17th Tennessee: Col Albert Smith Marks; 23rd Tennessee (8 companies): Ltc Richard Hudson Keeble; 25th Tennessee: Col John M. Hughes; 37th Tennessee: Col Moses White; 44th Tennessee: Col John S. Fulton; Darden's Battery (Mississippi) [2 12-pdr How, 2 6-pdr SB]: Cpt Putnam Darden
Third Division; 20 guns, k-113, w-709, m-10 = 832 MG Simon Bolivar Buckner	4th Brigade k-41, w-163, m-1 = 205 BG Sterling Alexander Martin Wood (w) Escort: 3rd Georgia Cavalry (Companies G & F): Cpt Reuben L. Hill	16th Alabama: Col William Basis Wood; 33rd Alabama: Col Samuel Adams (w), Ltc Robert F. Crittenden; 3rd Confederate: Ltc Henry Virtner Keep; 15th Mississippi Battalion Sharpshooters (Companies A & B): Maj Abner T. Hawkins; 32nd Mississippi: Col Mark Perrin Lowrey (w); 33rd Mississippi: Ltc Richard Charlton; Semple's Battery (Alabama) [4 12-pdr Nap, 2 6-pdr M1841 R]: Cpt Henry Churchill Semple
	2nd Cavalry Brigade k-3, w-1, m-0 = 3 Col Joseph Wheeler	1st Alabama Cavalry: Col William Wirt Allen (w); 3rd Alabama Cavalry: Col James Hagan; 1st CS Cavalry: Ltc Charles S. Robertson; 6th CS Cavalry: Ltc James Pell; 8th CS Cavalry: Col William B. Wade; 2nd Georgia Cavalry (5 companies): Maj Caleb A. Whaley; Smith's Cavalry Battalion (Georgia): Col John R. Hart; 1st Kentucky Cavalry (Companies A, B, E, F, & H): Maj John William Caldwell; 6th Kentucky Cavalry (Companies A, B, & D): Col J. Warren Grigsby; 9th Tennessee Cavalry: Col James D. Bennett; 12th Tennessee Cavalry: Ltc Thomas W. Adrian; Calvert's Battery (Arkansas) [1 section; 2 12-pdr How]: 2Lt Sylvanus G. Hanley

== See also ==
- Kentucky in the American Civil War
