= 9th Texas Infantry Regiment =

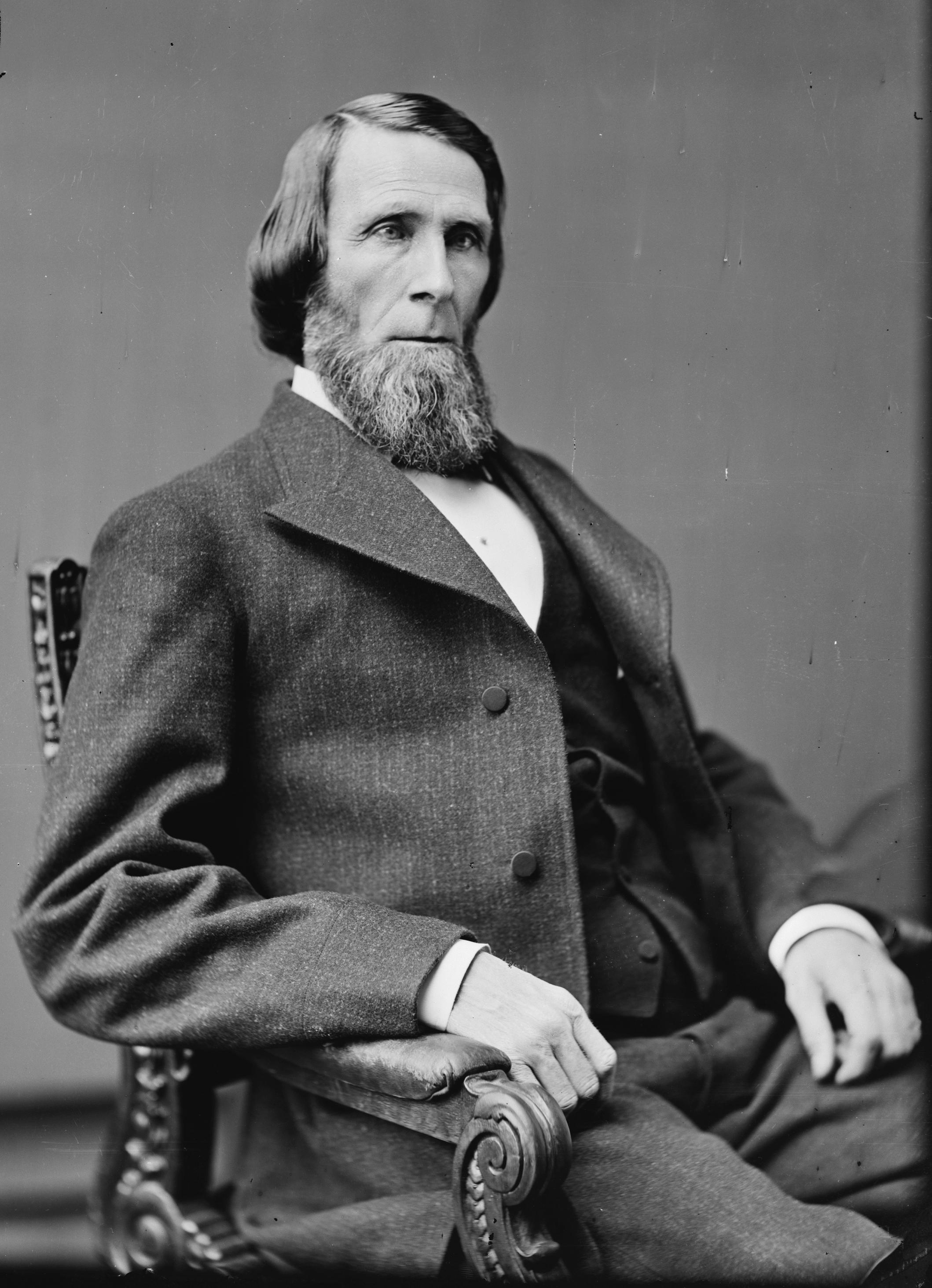
- Samuel B. Maxey was the regiment's first colonel.
- Active: 1 December 1861 – 11 May 1865
- Country: Confederate States of America
- Allegiance: Confederate States of America, Texas
- Branch: Confederate States Army
- Type: Infantry
- Size: Regiment
- Nickname: Maxey's Regiment
- Equipment: Rifled musket
- Engagements: American Civil War; Battle of Shiloh (1862); Battle of Perryville (1862); Battle of Stones River (1862); Battle of Chickamauga (1863); Atlanta campaign (1864); Battle of Allatoona (1864); Battle of Nashville (1864); Battle of Spanish Fort (1865); Battle of Fort Blakeley (1865)

Commanders
- Notable commanders: Samuel B. Maxey; William Hugh Young

The 9th Texas Infantry Regiment was a unit of Confederate States Army infantry volunteers organized in December 1861 that fought during the American Civil War. The regiment fought at Shiloh, Perryville, and Stones River in 1862, Chickamauga in 1863, the Atlanta campaign, Allatoona, and Nashville in 1864, and Spanish Fort and Fort Blakeley in 1865. The remaining 87 officers and men surrendered to Federal forces in May 1865. Two of the regiment's commanding officers were promoted brigadier general.

== History ==
=== Formation ===
The 9th Texas Infantry Regiment was formed on 4 November 1861 from 10 companies recruited in northeast Texas. The regiment was accepted into the Confederate States Army on 1 December under West Point graduate Samuel B. Maxey of Paris, Texas as colonel. The other field officers were Lieutenant Colonel William E. Beeson and Major Wright A. Stanley. Captain James Hill formed a cavalry company on 10 June 1861 and drilled it near a persimmon grove at Petty, Texas. Believing the militia laws would not allow cavalry units to leave the state, the company later disbanded. The men reformed as Company E of the 9th Texas Infantry and entered Confederate service on 26 November 1861. On 4 March 1862, Maxey received promotion to brigadier general. At this time, Stanley was promoted to colonel commanding the 9th Texas and Scottish immigrant James Burnet became major. The regiment would serve longer than any other Texas regiment in the Army of Mississippi and Army of Tennessee. Altogether, 1,018 soldiers would serve with the regiment during the war.

=== 1862 ===
On 26 March 1862 at Corinth, Mississippi the 9th Texas was assigned to James Patton Anderson's brigade in Daniel Ruggles's division from Braxton Bragg's II Corps. The regiment was brigaded with the 1st Florida Infantry Battalion, Confederate Guards Response Battalion, 17th Louisiana and 20th Louisiana Infantry Regiments, and 5th Company Washington Artillery. At the Battle of Shiloh on 6–7 April 1862, Anderson's brigade lost 69 killed, 313 wounded, and 52 missing, a total of 434 casualties. Anderson's brigade was initially deployed on the left flank of the second line, with Randall L. Gibson's brigade on its right and Preston Pond, Jr.'s brigade on its left. Within the brigade, the 1st Florida was on the right of the 9th Texas and the 20th Louisiana on the left. The brigade was soon in the front line where it drove the Union right wing back and overran two enemy batteries. When the Federal right wing retreated after several hours of fighting, Anderson swung his brigade to the right to join the struggle against the Union center. On the second day, the 9th Texas counterattacked the advancing Federal troops but was compelled to retreat. After detaching two companies, the 9th Texas took 226 troops into the battle and lost 14 killed, 42 wounded, and 11 missing. After Shiloh, the regiment was reorganized with a new colonel, William Hugh Young, a 24 year old graduate of the University of Virginia. Miles A. Dillard became lieutenant colonel and Burnet retained his rank as major.

At the Battle of Perryville on 6 October 1862, the 9th Texas was assigned to Preston Smith's brigade in Benjamin F. Cheatham's division. The Texans were brigaded with the 12th Tennessee, 13th Tennessee, 47th Tennessee, and 154th Tennessee Infantry Regiments, plus Scott's Tennessee Battery. Smith's brigade was the last Confederate unit to arrive at mid-morning and deployed just to the south of Perryville. After being repulsed in its attack on Philip Sheridan's Union division, Samuel Powell's brigade fell back across the Chaplin River. Smith's brigade formed a line 100 yd (91 m) behind Powell's men. There was no Federal pursuit because the corps commander Charles Champion Gilbert forbade it. On the morning of 7 October, as Preston Smith's brigade began to march away from the battlefield, Federal artillery fire killed one Texan.

At the Battle of Stones River on 31 December 1862 – 2 January 1863, the regiment was in the brigade led by Alfred Jefferson Vaughan Jr. The brigade included the same units as at Perryville, plus the 29th Tennessee, Allin's Sharpshooters, and an artillery battery. During the fighting Cheatham failed to coordinate the attacks made by the brigades under his command, some claimed because he was drunk. Vaughan's brigade went into action in a cramped position, so the brigade commander ordered the 9th Texas to operate with S. A. M. Wood's brigade on its left flank. After an initial success, Vaughn's Tennesseans fell back, but the 9th Texas kept going. The Texans soon found themselves in a deadly crossfire for thirty minutes between the 35th Illinois Infantry Regiment to their front and the 38th Illinois to their rear. Colonel Young finally seized the battle flag and led a charge that drove off the 35th Illinois. Unfortunately, Vaughan's brigade came up against Phillip Sheridan's Union division which was defending itself stubbornly. Out of 323 men in the 9th Texas, its losses were 18 killed, 102 wounded, and two missing. Colonel Young was wounded. Total casualties for Vaughan's brigade were 707 of which there were 105 killed, 564 wounded, and 38 missing.

=== 1863–1865 ===
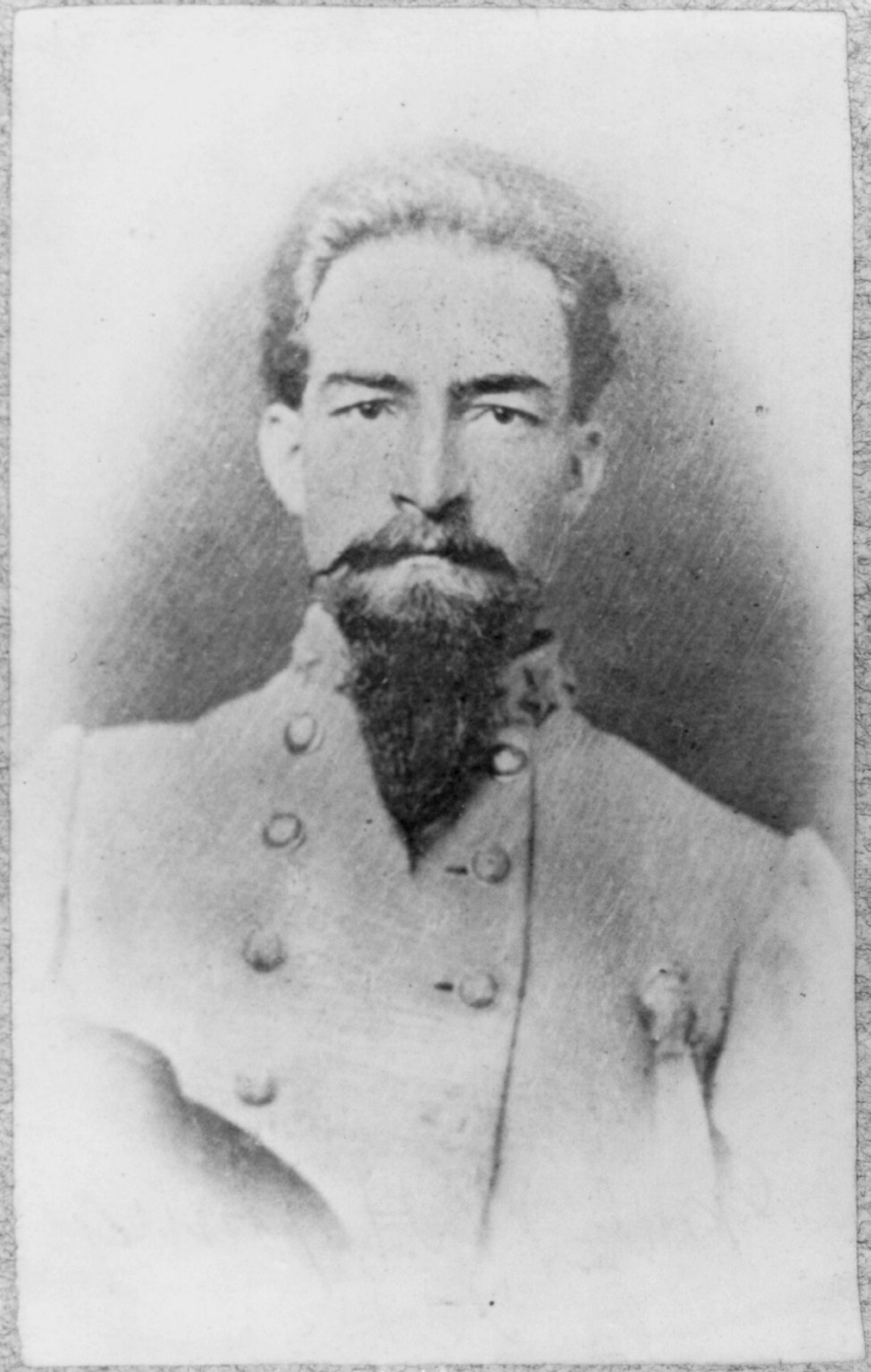
William H. Young

On 21 January 1863, the 9th Texas became part of Mathew Ector's brigade in which it remained for the rest of the war. The brigade's other units were the dismounted 10th Texas Cavalry, 14th Texas Cavalry, and 32nd Texas Cavalry Regiments. After being posted near Shelbyville, Tennessee, the brigade was sent to Mississippi in May in Joseph E. Johnston's unsuccessful attempt to raise the Siege of Vicksburg. In July 1863 the brigade was in action near Jackson, Mississippi.

During the Battle of Chickamauga on 19–20 September 1863, Ector's brigade was part of States Rights Gist's division in William H. T. Walker's corps. In addition to the Texas units, Ector's brigade included Stone's Alabama and Pound's Mississippi Sharpshooter Battalions and the 29th North Carolina Infantry Regiment. Early on the morning of 19 September, John T. Croxton's Federal infantry brigade bumped into a Confederate cavalry brigade led by Henry Brevard Davidson. Nathan Bedford Forrest was nearby and quickly fed infantry brigades under Claudius C. Wilson and Ector into the escalating struggle. Ector's soldiers became involved in a musketry duel with Ferdinand Van Derveer's Union brigade. Without effective artillery support, Ector withdrew his troops from the unequal battle after 30 minutes. Ector and Wilson suffered such heavy losses on the first day that their brigades were each reduced to about 500 men. On 20 September, Gist's division was ordered into action with Peyton H. Colquitt's 980 soldiers in the front line and Ector's and Wilson's men in the second line. The assault failed with heavy losses and Colquitt was killed. Ector's and Wilson's troops covered the retreat of Colquitt's survivors. Ector's brigade lost 59 killed, 239 wounded, and 138 missing in the battle. Out of 145 men present for duty, the 9th Texas lost six killed, 38 wounded, and 18 missing.

Ector's brigade transferred to Mississippi for the winter and missed the Battle of Missionary Ridge. The brigade was reassigned to Samuel Gibbs French's division in Leonidas Polk's corps. On 6 April 1864 the 9th Texas soldiers re-enlisted. The 39th North Carolina Infantry Regiment and Jacques's Battalion joined Ector's brigade for the Atlanta campaign, while the two sharpshooter battalions were no longer in the order of battle. French's 4,174-man division joined Johnston's army on 19 May 1864, after the start of the campaign. During the Atlanta Campaign, the 9th Texas lost 16 killed, 39 wounded, and one captured. In July Ector was wounded and had a leg amputated. Colonel Young replaced him in command of the brigade while Major James H. McReynolds became commander of the 9th Texas.

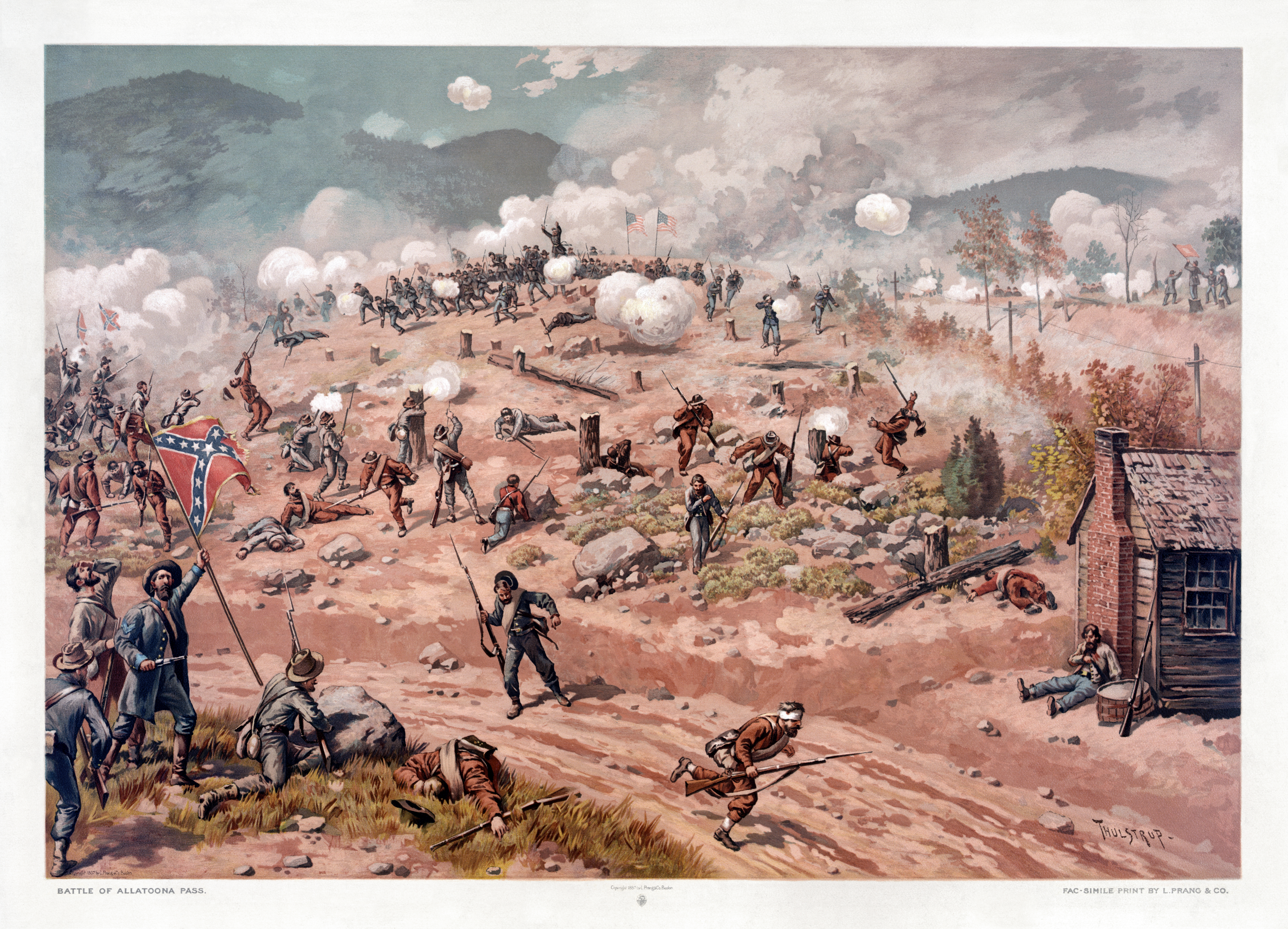
The Battle of Allatoona on 5 October 1864 cost the 9th Texas Infantry 45 casualties.

In the Battle of Allatoona on 5 October 1864, the 9th Texas sustained losses of 43 killed or wounded and two missing out of 101 present for duty. Leading the brigade, Young was wounded in a foot which had to be amputated; he was captured and spent the rest of the war in a Federal prison camp. French's division attacked John M. Corse's Union garrison in Allatoona, Georgia and was repulsed after desperate fighting. The victors suffered 707 casualties out of 1,944 soldiers. During John Bell Hood's invasion of Tennessee, the brigade missed the Battle of Franklin because it was guarding the army's pontoon bridges. The 9th Texas fought in the Battle of Nashville on 15–16 December 1864 as part of Alexander P. Stewart's corps. Ector's brigade was still in French's division and led by Colonel D. Coleman.

The spring of 1865 found Ector's brigade defending Mobile, Alabama. In this campaign, Edward Canby led 45,000 Federal troops while Dabney H. Maury commanded 10,000 Confederate soldiers and 300 cannons. In the Battle of Spanish Fort two divisions of the Union XIII Corps under Gordon Granger on the left and two divisions of the Union XVI Corps under Andrew Jackson Smith on the right laid siege to the fort. The defenses were manned by the brigades of Ector, James T. Holtzclaw, and Randall L. Gibson, from left to right. After the Federal troops gained a foothold, the fort was evacuated on the night of 8–9 April 1865 with the loss of about 50 guns and 500 prisoners. This was followed by the Battle of Fort Blakeley on 9 April when 3,423 Confederate troops were captured. The survivors of Maury's command retreated to Meridian, Mississippi.

The remaining eight officers and 79 men of the 9th Texas surrendered and were paroled on 11 May 1865 at Meridian. Instead of handing over the 9th Texas battle flag, Charlie Matthews hid the banner in his shirt and was alleged to have kept it as late as 1909. Colonel Young became an attorney and died in San Antonio in 1901. Captain R. Milton Board of Company I died on 10 April 1931. The last known member of the 9th Texas, R. B. Whisenant died on 1 January 1937.

== See also ==
- List of Texas Civil War Confederate units
- Texas in the American Civil War
