= Battle of Perryville order of battle =

The order of battle for the Battle of Perryville (also known as the Battle of Chaplin Hills) includes:

- Battle of Perryville order of battle: Confederate
- Battle of Perryville order of battle: Union
