= 154th Senior Tennessee Infantry Regiment =

Infantry regiment of the Confederate States Army

- National Color of the 154th Tennessee at the Tennessee State Museum in Nashville
- Active: 1861–1865
- Disbanded: 9 April 1865
- Country: Confederate States
- Allegiance: Tennessee
- Branch: Army
- Type: Infantry
- Size: Regiment
- Part of: Vaughan's Brigade
- Facings: Light blue
- Battles: American Civil War; Battle of Belmont; Battle of Shiloh; Siege of Corinth; Battle of Richmond; Battle of Perryville; Battle of Stones River; Battle of Chickamauga; Battle of Missionary Ridge; Battle of Dalton; Battle of Franklin; Battle of Nashville; Battle of Bentonville

Commanders
- Notable commanders: Col. William H. Carroll; Col. Preston Smith

The 154th Senior Tennessee Infantry Regiment, also known as the First Tennessee Volunteers, was an infantry formation of the Confederate States Army in the Western Theater of the American Civil War. It became part of the Second Consolidated Tennessee Infantry Regiment about April 9, 1865.

== Background ==
The 154th Senior Tennessee Infantry Regiment was originally organized in 1842 as the 154th Tennessee Militia Regiment and incorporated on March 22, 1860.

== History ==
The regiment was reorganized at Fort Wright, near Randolph, Tennessee, on May 14, 1861, for 12 months. It was permitted to retain its old number.

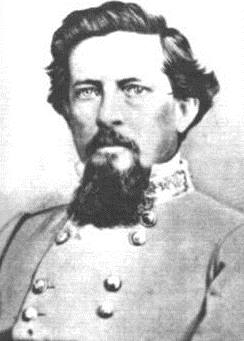
Preston Smith

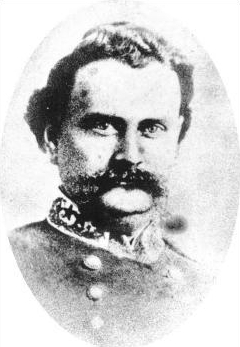
Marcus J. Wright

The elected original field officers were Colonel Preston Smith, Lieutenant Colonel Marcus J. Wright and Major Jones Genette.

Company A (Light Guards) - Capt. James Genette - Shelby County (Major Genette was replaced by Capt. C. L. Powers)

Company B (Bluff City Grays) - Capt. James H. Edmondson - Shelby County (became an independent sharpshooter company in 1862)

Company B - Capt. H. E. DeGraffenried - Fayette County (organized on May 16, 1862)

Company C (Jackson Guards) - Capt. Michael Magevney Jr. - Shelby County

Company D (Memphis Zouaves / Harris Zouave Cadets) - Capt. Sterling Fowlkes - Shelby County

Company E (Hickory Rifles) - Capt. John D. Martin - Shelby County

Company F (Henry Guards) - Capt. Edward Fitzgerald - Henry County

Company G (Southern Guards) - Capt. James Hamilton - Shelby County (withdrew from regimental mustering and became "Company L, 1st Tennessee Heavy Artillery")

Company G (The Beauregards) - Capt. James S. Moreland - Shelby County

Company H (Crockett Rangers) - Capt. Marsh M. Patrick - Shelby County

Company I (McNairy Guards) - Capt. Alphonso Cross - McNairy County

Company K (Sons of Liberty) - Capt. Thomas H. Hancock - Hardeman County

Company L (Maynard Rifles) - Capt. E. A. Cole - Shelby County (organized on March 8, 1862)

The Steuben Artillery was attached to the regiment during its state service, but disbanded in August 1861.

On August 13, 1861, at New Madrid, Missouri, the regiment was mustered into Confederate service with 802 men under arms. On September 7 it was brigaded under command of Col. Benjamin F. Cheatham. When Cheatham advanced to division command Preston Smith was given command of a small brigade including his own 154th as well as Blythe's Mississippi Regiment and Hudson's Battery. Participating in the Battle of Belmont on November 7 the regiment was under command of Lt. Col. Wright. The regiment was one of the few that crossed the Mississippi River (in the steamer Kentucky) in the attempt to cut the Union's line of retreat. The command was not able to inhibit the retreat; though i.a. the regiment captured some military equipment and a dozen prisoners. Wright reports the regiment's losses as one man killed and 12 wounded.

In March 1862 the regiment received its new flag when Gen. P.G.T. Beauregard attempt to standardize the battle flags of the Army of Tennessee. It was made by sail maker Henry Cassidy in New Orleans and made of lightweight cotton fabric with 12 six-pointed silk stars. At Shiloh in April 1862 the brigade was under command of Brig. Gen. Bushrod R. Johnson and Smith commanded the regiment again. In the advance on April 6 the 154th was on the right of the brigade, the brigade and division being close to the center of the Confederate line. The division advanced against the Illinois division of Gen. McClernand. While the attack dislocated the enemy and led to the capture of numerous guns, the 154th alone taking four of the six guns of Dresser's Illinois battery, it didn't come without cost. Generals Cheatham and Johnson were both wounded, i.a. reinstating Preston Smith as brigade commander and Wright to command the regiment. Afterwards the brigade was ordered to advance to the right against elements of W.H.L. Wallace's division. During this time companies B and G were separated from the regiment, and were not able to join their unit until the day's fighting ended; instead gathering and escorting prisoners of the previous clash. While the regiment moved in close support of the advancing artillery the new Company L, armed with Maynard rifles, was detached to skirmish on the brigade's right, and stayed detached till the nightly hours of early April 7. When the rejoined regiment was ordered with the brigade to the Confederate line it was put under heavy fire from Gen. William "Bull" Nelson's newly arrived division; and together with a portion of another regiment (Blythe's) lost contact to the brigade. The regimental battle flag was lost 20 paces from the Union lines, several color bearers being shot on both days, but it was recaptured by Capt. George Mellersh. Now in the general move to the rear it fell in with Jones M. Withers's division and retreated in good order. Starting the battle with about 650 men present it lost 23 killed, 163 wounded and 11 missing.

Afterwards the 154th had a rapid succession of brigade assignments. In May it was reported in Donelson's brigade, in June in Fulton's and Russell's brigades; but finally, at Tupelo on July 8, it was given their final brigade assignment throughout the war - again in the brigade of Col. Preston Smith which was completed by the 12th, 13th and 47th Tennessee Infantry Regiments as well as Bankhead's Battery. Also part of Smith's brigade was Edmondson's Sharpshooter Company, which has been Company B of the 154th till now. Lt. Col. Wright, himself being wounded at Shiloh on April 6 and appointed military governor of Columbus, Kentucky, transferred from the regiment and served as Adjutant General to Gen. Cheatham. As the last Major, John D. Martin, raised and commanded the 25th Mississippi Infantry; the regiment was commanded by Major Edward Fitzgerald. Fitzgerald was made Colonel; but was killed on August 30 in the Battle of Richmond. His successor as regimental commander was Lt. Col., Irishman Michael Magevney. In December 1862 only 245 men were present for the Battle of Stones River, in which 41% were lost (14 killed, 84 wounded and 4 missing).

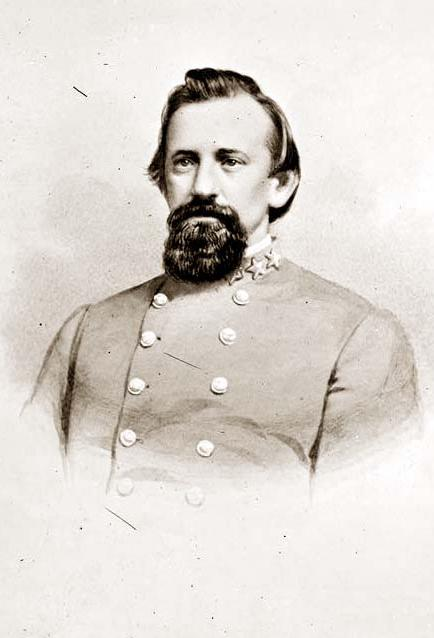
Alfred J. Vaughan

The regiment went into winter quarters at Shelbyville, Tennessee. Here it was consolidated with the equally-depleted 13th Tennessee Infantry Regiment and constituted the 13th and 154th Tennessee Infantry Regiment with Col. Alfred J. Vaughan in command; though the muster rolls were kept separated for the duration of the war. After the Tullahoma Campaign in mid 1863 Smith's brigade (still in Cheatham's Division of Polk's Corps) consisted of the 11th, 12th-47th, 13th-154th and 29th Tennessee regiments as well as a detachment of sharpshooters known as Dawson's Sharpshooter Battalion.

The regiment was located in "the angle" at the battle of Kennesaw Mountain Georgia in June 1864. The angle turned out to be the main point of attack by Union General Sherman. The Union attack was repulsed while suffering a great number of casualties. It participated in the battle of Peachtree Creek ordered by the newly appointed commander of The Army of Tennessee General John Bell Hood on July 20, 1864. This battle was fought just outside of the city of Atlanta with the battlefield now well within the modern day city of Atlanta. The confederate attack had initial success taking ground and cannon from the Union forces there. The attack was not supported, however, and Union reinforcements eventually regained the lost ground.

Former members of the 2nd Consolidated Tennessee Infantry Regiment were paroled at Greensboro, North Carolina, on May 2, 1865.

== Commanding officers ==
Col. William H. Carroll	1860 (as 154th Tennessee Militia)
Col. Preston Smith (occasionally absent as brigade commander, promoted)	May 14, 1861 – July 8, 1862
Col. Edward Fitzgerald (killed)	July 8, 1862 – August 30, 1862
Col. Michael Magevney Jr. (regimental consolidation)	August 30, 1862 – March, 1863
Col. Alfred J. Vaughan (occasionally absent as brigade commander, promoted)	March, 1863 – November 18, 1863
Col. Michael Magevney Jr. (occasionally absent as brigade commander, captured)	November 18, 1863 – December 16, 1864

== Notable people ==
- John D. Martin
- Marcus J. Wright

== In popular culture ==
The Bluff City Grays - Co. B, 154th Sr. Regiment, 1st Tennessee Infantry is a Memphis-based Confederate living history association with reenactors from western Tennessee, northern Mississippi, eastern Arkansas and southern Missouri. The company's purpose is to create an authentic impression of the common Confederate foot soldier; in the garb, with the gear and persona of the troops of Co. B, 154th Senior Regiment, 1st Tennessee, CSA, circa 1861.

The 154th Senior Tennessee Infantry Company K inc was organized in the late 1970s in Northwest Indiana and Northern Illinois. Many of the 1970s original members are still participating with the 154th. The company has both Confederate and Union impression and several civilians and auxiliaries. It also has a "Soldier in the Classroom" program.

== See also ==
- List of Confederate units from Tennessee
