= Army of the Ohio =

Two separate units of the Union Army in the American Civil War

- Active: 1861–62; 1863–65
- Country: United States of America
- Branch: United States Army
- Type: Field army
- Engagements: American Civil War: Battle of Mill Springs; Battle of Shiloh; Battle of Perryville; Battle of Franklin

Commanders
- Notable commanders: Don Carlos Buell; William S. Rosecrans; Ambrose Burnside; John M. Schofield

The Army of the Ohio was the name of two Union armies in the American Civil War, named for the Ohio River. The first army became the Army of the Cumberland and the second army was created in 1863.

== History ==
=== 1st Army of the Ohio ===
General Orders No. 97 appointed Maj. Gen. Don Carlos Buell to command the Department of the Ohio. All the forces of the department were then organized into the Army of the Ohio, with Buell in command. Early in 1862, the army fought its first battle at Mill Springs, although only the 1st Division, commanded by Brig. Gen. George H. Thomas, was engaged. The whole army marched to reinforce Grant's Army of the Tennessee at the Battle of Shiloh.

Buell was replaced as commander of the Department of the Ohio by Brig. Gen. Horatio G. Wright in August 1862, but because of Wright's junior rank, Maj. Gen. Henry W. Halleck ordered Thomas to replace Wright in command. However, Thomas foresaw a major battle and felt it unwise to change an army commander on the eve of battle. Thus Buell remained in command of the Army and Thomas was made his second-in-command.

The battle Thomas foresaw occurred on October 8, 1862, west of Perryville, Kentucky. Confederate General Braxton Bragg had marched into Kentucky to recruit soldiers and take the state from the Union. The full force of Buell's command was gathering when Bragg attacked. Known as the Battle of Perryville, or the Battle of Chaplin Hills, casualties were very high on both sides.

Union casualties totaled 4,276 (894 killed, 2,911 wounded, 471 captured or missing). Confederate casualties were 3,401 (532 killed, 2,641 wounded, 228 captured or missing). [1] Although Union losses were comparatively much higher, Bragg withdrew from Kentucky when the fighting was over, and therefore Perryville is considered a strategic victory for the Union.

Buell was subsequently relieved of all field command. Maj. Gen. William S. Rosecrans was appointed to command the Army of the Ohio. He was also appointed to the command of the Department of the Cumberland and subsequently renamed his forces the Army of the Cumberland.

=== 2nd Army of the Ohio ===
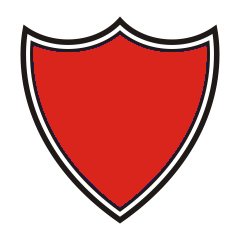
Badge of the XXIII Corps.

On 25 March 1863, Maj. Gen. Ambrose Burnside assumed command of the Department of the Ohio headquartered in Cincinnati, Ohio. On March 19, 1863, two divisions of the IX Corps under Maj. Gen. John G. Parke had been ordered from Virginia to Burnside's department. On April 27, 1863, the War Department ordered all troops in Kentucky not belonging to IX Corps to be organized into the XXIII Corps under the commanded of Maj. Gen. George L. Hartsuff. By May 1863 Burnside had consolidated the forces of Kentucky into the IX Corps and XXIII Corps which he styled the Army of the Ohio. Thus, Burnside became one of the few officers to directly command two completely different armies (he had earlier commanded the Army of the Potomac). The IX Corps was soon transferred to Mississippi in June to participate in the siege of Vicksburg but was returned to the Army of the Ohio in August.

Meanwhile, the new Army of the Ohio' XXIII Corps repelled Morgan's Ohio raid, although the entire army rarely functioned as one complete unit during this campaign. Reunited with the IX Corps and the addition of a cavalry division, Burnside moved to Knoxville, Tennessee. There he defeated the Confederates at the Battle of Fort Sanders in the Knoxville Campaign. After the battle, he asked to be relieved of command due to illness. Maj. Gen. John G. Foster replaced Burnside as commander of the Army and Department of the Ohio on December 9.

Foster's time in command of the Army was short. On February 9, 1864, Maj. Gen. John M. Schofield assumed command of the Department of the Ohio, and then the Army of the Ohio and the XXIII Corps in April. During this time the XXIII Corps and the Army of the Ohio were synonymous. Schofield led the Army during the Atlanta campaign and pursued Confederate Lt. Gen. John Bell Hood into Tennessee after the fall of Atlanta. At the Battle of Franklin, Schofield inflicted a severe defeat on Hood's army before joining with Maj. Gen. George H. Thomas and the Army of the Cumberland for the Battle of Nashville. On February 9, 1865, Schofield was transferred to command the Department of North Carolina. When Schofield departed to assume departmental command, Maj. Gen. Jacob D. Cox temporarily assumed command of the Army.

The XXIII Corps was ordered to North Carolina and only Cox's division was present for the Battle of Wilmington. It was not until March 1865 that the rest of the XXIII Corps landed at New Bern, North Carolina. Upon the arrival of the XXIII Corps in its entirety, Schofield joined that corps with the X Corps under Maj. Gen. Alfred H. Terry to form the Army of the Ohio. The Army was designated the Center Wing of Maj. Gen. William T. Sherman's army and participated in the final stages of the Carolinas campaign. With the close of the war, the troops were mustered out of military service. A number of post-war reunions were held by various elements of the old Army of the Ohio.

== Commanders ==
- Maj. Gen. Don Carlos Buell (November 15, 1861 – October 24, 1862) also department commander until March 11
- Maj. Gen. William S. Rosecrans (October 24–30, 1862) became the Army of the Cumberland
- Maj. Gen. Ambrose Burnside (March 25 – December 9, 1863) also department commander
- Maj. Gen. John G. Foster (December 9, 1863 – February 9, 1864) also department commander
- Maj. Gen. John M. Schofield (February 9 – September 14, 1864) also department commander
- Maj. Gen. Jacob D. Cox (September 14 – October 22, 1864)
- Maj. Gen. John M. Schofield (October 22, 1864 – February 2, 1865)
- Maj. Gen. Jacob D. Cox (February 2–9, 1865)
- Maj. Gen. John M. Schofield (February 9 – March 31, 1865) also commander of the Department of North Carolina

== Major battles and campaigns ==
- Battle of Shiloh (Buell)
- Battle of Perryville (Buell)
- Morgan's Raid (Burnside)
- Knoxville Campaign (Burnside), (Foster)
- Atlanta campaign (Schofield)
- Battle of Franklin (Schofield)
- Battle of Nashville (Schofield)
- Carolinas campaign (Schofield)

== Orders of Battle ==
- Shiloh Union order of battle
- Perryville Union order of battle
- Knoxville Union order of battle
- Atlanta Campaign Union order of battle
- Franklin Union order of battle
- Nashville Union order of battle
- Wilmington Union order of battle

Notes

1. Livermore, Thomas L., Numbers and Losses in the American Civil War 1861–1865, New York, 1901, p. 95, cited in McDonough, James Lee, War in Kentucky, University of Tennessee Press, 1994, pp 289–290. ISBN 0-87049-847-9. Noe, Kenneth W. Perryville: This Grand Havoc of Battle. Lexington: University Press of Kentucky, 2001. ISBN 978-0-8131-2209-0.
