= Matthew Ector =

American politician

Matthew Duncan Ector
- Born: February 28, 1822; Putnam County, Georgia
- Died: October 29, 1879 (aged 57); Tyler, Texas
- Burial place: Greenwood Cemetery, (Harrison County, Texas)
- Military career
- Allegiance: Confederate States of America
- Branch: Confederate States Army
- Service years: 1861–65
- Rank: Brigadier General
- Units: 3rd Texas Cavalry
- Commands: 14th Texas Cavalry; Ector's Brigade
- Conflicts: American Civil War

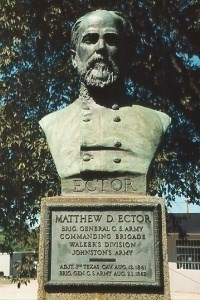
A bronze bust of Ector by Anton Schaaf at Vicksburg National Military Park, 1915

Matthew Duncan Ector (February 28, 1822 – October 29, 1879) was an American legislator, a Texas jurist, and a general in the Confederate States Army during the American Civil War.

== Early life ==
Ector was born in Putnam County, Georgia, to Hugh and Dorothy Ector. The family moved to Greenville, Georgia, soon after. He was educated at Centre College in Danville, Kentucky, before reading for law in the office of Hiram B. Warner. Ector served a single term in the Georgia state legislature in 1842 before moving to Texas in 1850.

Ector was admitted to the bar in 1851 in Henderson, Texas, and began the practice of law. That same year, he married Letitia Graham, who died in 1859. In 1856, he was elected to the Texas House of Representatives from Rusk County.

In Atlanta in 1864, he wed Sarah P. "Sallie" Chew. One daughter of this marriage, Anne Ector, became the wife of Louisiana Governor Ruffin Pleasant (1916–1920).

== Civil War ==
When the Civil War broke out, Ector enlisted as a private in the 3rd Texas Cavalry Regiment of the Confederate army. He was soon elected lieutenant. He served as adjutant to Brigadier General Joseph L. Hogg and saw action in Texas and Arkansas. He was promoted to colonel and given command of the 14th Texas Cavalry Regiment. Then in August 1862, he was promoted again to brigadier general and assigned command of a brigade. He fought at the Battle of Murfreesboro in Tennessee and Chickamauga in Georgia. His men and he were then assigned duty in Mississippi, returning in time for the Atlanta campaign in the summer of 1864.

At the Battle of Stones River on December 31, 1862, Ector commanded a brigade in John P. McCown's division, William J. Hardee corps. The brigade included dismounted cavalry regiments fighting as infantry. These were the 10th Texas, 11th Texas, 14th Texas, and 32nd Texas Cavalry Regiments, and Douglas's Texas Battery. Losses were 28 killed, 276 wounded, and 48 missing. At the Battle of Chickamauga on September 19–20, 1863, Ector's brigade was part of States Rights Gist's division, William H. T. Walker's corps. The brigade consisted of Stone's Alabama Battalion, Pound's Mississippi Battalion, the 29th North Carolina Infantry, 9th Texas Infantry, and the dismounted 10th, 14th, and 32nd Texas Cavalry Regiments. It sustained losses of 59 killed, 239 wounded, and 138 missing.

During the Atlanta Campaign in the summer of 1864, Ector's brigade was in Samuel G. French's division, Leonidas Polk's corps. The brigade comprised Jaques's Battalion, the 29th and 39th North Carolina, and 9th Texas Infantry, and the dismounted 10th, 14th, and 32nd Texas Cavalry Regiments. Ector's military career essentially ended on July 27, 1864, in fighting near Atlanta, Georgia. He was severely wounded and his left leg was amputated at the knee. The war ended before his recovery was complete, although he did travel to Mobile, Alabama, to assume command of the defenses there late in early 1865.

Three brigades under Randall L. Gibson, James T. Holtzclaw, and Ector fought in the Battle of Spanish Fort on 8 April 1865 near Mobile. The much larger Union army seized part of the defenses, forcing the Confederates to evacuate Spanish Fort with the loss of 93 killed, 395 wounded, 250 missing, and 50 cannons. On May 4, the Confederate army formally surrendered at Citronelle, Alabama.

== Postbellum ==
Matthew returned to Texas and moved to Marshall in 1868. After serving in several local judicial roles, he was elected to the Texas Court of Appeals in 1875, serving until his death in Tyler, Texas, in 1879. His remains were returned to the Methodist church in Marshall, and he is buried in the Greenwood Cemetery there.

== Honors ==
Ector County, Texas, is named for him.

== See also ==
- List of American Civil War generals (Confederate)
