= Otho F. Strahl =

American lawyer

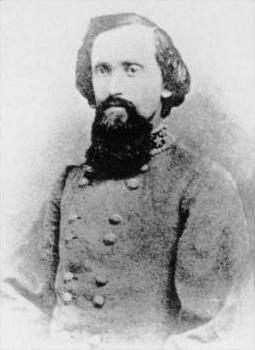
- Strahl in uniform, c. 1862
- Born: Otho French Strahl; June 3, 1831; Morgan County, Ohio, U.S.
- Died: November 30, 1864 (aged 33); Franklin, Tennessee, C.S.
- Burial place: Dyersburg City Cemetery, Dyersburg, Tennessee, U.S.
- Alma mater: Ohio Wesleyan University
- Military career
- Allegiance: Confederate States
- Branch: Army
- Service years: 1861–1864
- Rank: Brigadier-General
- Commands: 4th Tennessee Infantry (1862); 4th/5th Tennessee Infantry (1862-63); Strahl's Brigade (1863-64)
- Battles: American Civil War; Battle of Shiloh; Siege of Corinth; Battle of Perryville; Battle of Stones River; Battle of Chickamauga; Chattanooga campaign; Atlanta campaign; Battle of Franklin †

Brigadier-General Otho French Strahl (June 3, 1831 – November 30, 1864) was a senior officer of the Confederate States Army who commanded infantry in the Western Theater of the American Civil War. Prior to the war, he was a lawyer in Dyersburg, Tennessee. Strahl was one of a small number of Confederate generals born in the North.

== Early life and education ==
Otho F. Strahl was born near Elliotts Cross Roads, Ohio, and raised in nearby Malta, both in rural Morgan County. His parents were Philip Strahl and Rhoda French.

Both of his grandmothers had been raised in the South and, through their strong influence, Strahl became an ardent supporter of states' rights. Strahl was a graduate of Ohio Wesleyan University. He went south to Tennessee, reading law in Somerville and, being admitted to the bar in 1858, opening a practice in Dyersburg.

== American Civil War ==
With the outbreak of the American Civil War, Strahl raised a local infantry company among friends and neighbors in Dyersburg. He became the captain of his company of the newly raised 4th Tennessee Infantry in May 1861. He and the regiment were transferred to Confederate service in August of that year. He was promoted to lieutenant colonel on May 15, 1862.

After the Battle of Shiloh on April 24 Strahl was promoted to colonel and led his unit into the Battle of Perryville. The regiment was reorganized and consolidated with the 5th Tennessee Infantry in December right before the Battle of Stones River. Strahl led this 4th/5th Tennessee Infantry until he was assigned to command the brigade of Alexander P. Stewart in June 1863, and was promoted to brigadier general on July 28. He commanded a brigade in the campaigns of Chickamauga, Chattanooga and Atlanta.

On November 30, 1864, at the Battle of Franklin, Strahl was leading his men on foot, when he was shot in the neck; he was struck and killed by another two bullets to the head. His body was taken to the back porch of the local Carnton plantation house, where he lay until he was buried near the battlefield. In 1901, his body was reinterred in Old City Cemetery in Dyersburg, Tennessee.

== See also ==
- List of Confederate generals
