= William Hugh Young =

Confederate States Army brigadier general (1838–1901)

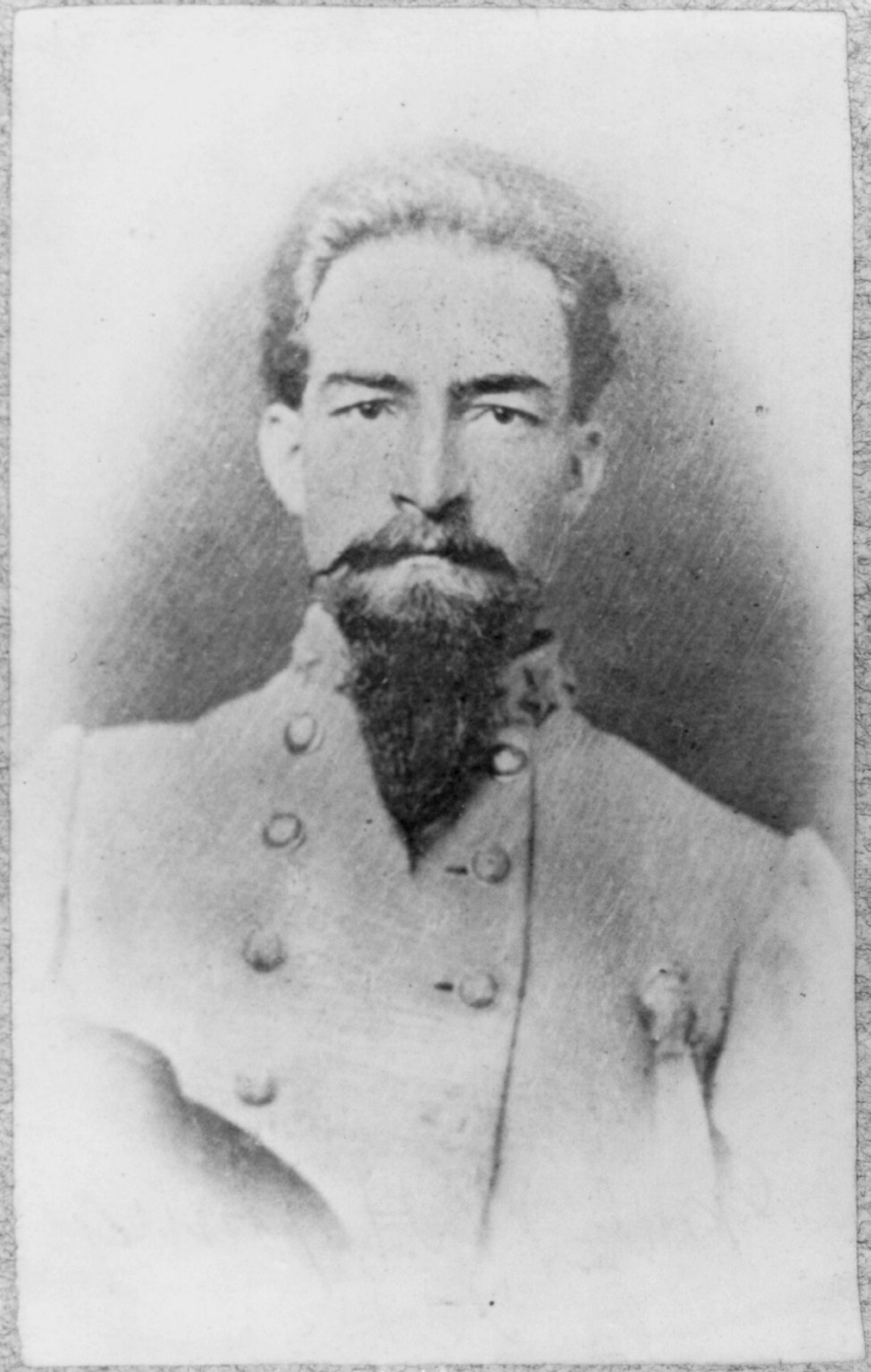
- Born: January 1, 1838; Boonville, Missouri
- Died: November 28, 1901 (aged 63); San Antonio, Texas
- Burial place: Confederate Cemetery, San Antonio, Texas
- Military career
- Allegiance: Confederate States of America
- Branch: Confederate States Army
- Service years: 1861–1865
- Rank: Brigadier General
- Conflicts: American Civil War

William Hugh Young (January 1, 1838 – November 28, 1901) was a Confederate States Army brigadier general during the American Civil War (Civil War). He was a university student and received a military education before the Civil War. He was a lawyer and real estate operator in San Antonio, Texas after the Civil War. Young spent nine months at the end of the war as a prisoner of war.

== Early life ==
William H. Young was born January 1, 1838, at Boonville, Missouri. His family moved to Red River County, Texas in 1841 and later to Grayson County, Texas. His father was Hugh Franklin Young (1808–1888), who was born in Augusta County, Virginia. Hugh F. Young was a county judge in Grayson County, Texas before the war. Hugh Franklin Young has been referred to as a Confederate general in some sources, including the "Official Records of the American Civil War," but he was actually a brigadier general of the 15th Brigade of the Texas Militia in 1862, not a general in the Confederate States Army.

Young attended Washington College in Tennessee, McKenzie College in Texas and, between 1859 and 1861, at the University of Virginia, where he studied tactics in the military academy after his graduation in June 1861.

Young married Frances M. Kemper of Port Republic, Virginia. They had one son, Dr. Hugh Hampton Young, who was born in San Antonio, Texas in 1870.

== American Civil War service ==
On July 25, 1861, Young became aide-de-camp to Governor of Texas Edward Clark. Clark was lieutenant governor and became governor when Governor Sam Houston refused to take an oath of allegiance to the Confederacy and was deposed. Clark served as governor between March 18, 1861 and November 7, 1861. In September 1861, Young became a captain in the 9th Texas Infantry Regiment.

As part of the Army of Mississippi at the Battle of Shiloh under Brigadier General James Patton Anderson and Major General Braxton Bragg, the 9th Texas Infantry Regiment, was decimated and routed by an Illinois artillery battery. Soon after the Battle of Shiloh, Young became colonel of the regiment in April 1862 and was in the defense of Corinth, Mississippi during the Siege of Corinth. He fought with his regiment at the Battle of Perryville. He was wounded in the right shoulder and had two horses shot from under him at the Battle of Stones River (Murfreesboro), December 31, 1862. Young and his men were specially commended by Major General Benjamin F. Cheatham.

Young was wounded in the right thigh at the Battle of Jackson, Mississippi, July 13, 1863, while fighting with General Joseph E. Johnston's forces in the Vicksburg Campaign. Soon thereafter, on September 20, 1863, he was wounded in the chest at the Battle of Chickamauga.

On July 27, 1864, Young took command of his regiment's brigade in Major General Samuel Gibbs French's division of III Corps, Army of Tennessee, when its commander, Brigadier General Mathew Ector was seriously wounded. Young held this command until he was captured on October 5, 1864. He was wounded in the neck and jaw at the Battle of Kennesaw Mountain, Georgia, June 1864.

Young was promoted to brigadier general (temporary) on August 15, 1864, to succeed the disabled Brigadier General Ector. He was wounded, lost his left foot, had his horse shot from under him and was captured at the Battle of Allatoona, Georgia on October 5, 1864. He spent the rest of the war as a prisoner of war, four months at Union hospitals and five months at the prisoner of war camp at Johnson's Island, in Lake Erie near Sandusky, Ohio. Young finally was paroled on July 24, 1865.

== Aftermath ==
After the Civil War, William H. Young returned to Texas. He was a lawyer, real estate agent and editor of the San Antonio Express.

William Hugh Young died on November 28, 1901, at San Antonio, Texas. He is buried at the Confederate Cemetery, San Antonio.

== See also ==
- List of American Civil War generals (Confederate)
