= James T. Holtzclaw =

American lawyer

James Thadeus Holtzclaw
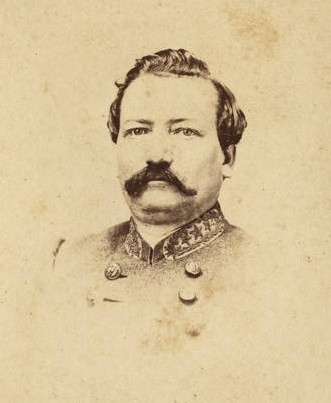
- Born: December 17, 1833; McDonough, Georgia, US
- Died: July 19, 1893 (aged 59); Montgomery, Alabama, US
- Burial place: Oakwood Cemetery, Montgomery, Alabama
- Military career
- Allegiance: United States; Confederate States of America
- Branch: Confederate States Army
- Service years: 1861–65
- Rank: Brigadier General
- Commands: 18th Alabama Infantry; Holtzclaw's Brigade
- Conflicts: American Civil War: Battle of Shiloh; Battle of Chickamauga; Chattanooga Campaign; Battle of Missionary Ridge; Atlanta campaign; Franklin-Nashville Campaign
- Other work: attorney, railroad commissioner

James Thadeus Holtzclaw (December 17, 1833 – July 19, 1893) was an Alabama lawyer, railroad commissioner, and general in the Confederate States Army during the American Civil War. He played a prominent role of several major engagements of the Army of Tennessee in the Western Theater.

== Early life and career ==
James T. Holtzclaw was born in McDonough in rural Henry County, Georgia, in the winter of 1833. His parents, Elijah and Mary Holtzclaw, were from Chambers County, Alabama, where young Holtzclaw was raised and educated. He obtained his primary education at the local Presbyterian high school, East Alabama Institute, in Lafayette.

In 1853, he received an appointment to the United States Military Academy, but declined and did not formally enter the school. In December, he began to study law in Montgomery, Alabama, under the famed pro-secession "Fire-Eater" William Lowndes Yancey. He passed his bar exam in 1855, and established a private practice in Montgomery, Alabama. A fellow lover of fine horses, he became a lifelong friend and supporter of Yancey. He married Mary A. "Molly" Cowles, a daughter of another prominent Montgomery resident.

== Civil War service ==
At the outbreak of the Civil War in early 1861, Holtzclaw served as a lieutenant in a local militia company, the Montgomery True Blues. He participated in the capture of the U.S. Navy yard in Pensacola, Florida. In May, he enlisted in the Confederate army as a lieutenant in the 18th Alabama Infantry. In August of that same year, he was promoted to major and then in December to lieutenant colonel.

In April 1862 at the Battle of Shiloh in Western Tennessee, Holtzclaw was seriously wounded in his right lung during the first day of fighting. He was initially thought to have been mortally wounded, but made an amazing recovery and was back in his duties after only ninety days. He was promoted to colonel and served for a time in Montgomery. In 1863, he was again wounded, this time when he was thrown from his horse during the Battle of Chickamauga in northern Georgia. However, the injury was not serious enough to force him from the field. In November 1863, he assumed command of a brigade in Stewart's Division in Second Corps of the Army of Tennessee and led it during the Chattanooga Campaign, including the Battle of Lookout Mountain. For a time, he temporarily led the brigade of Henry Clayton.

On July 7, 1864, Holtzclaw received a promotion to brigadier general and assumed permanent command of Clayton's Brigade. He took part in John Bell Hood's campaign in Tennessee and was wounded a third time, this time a severe contusion on his ankle, during the Battle of Franklin on December 17. However, he maintained his duties and his brigade acted as rear guard for the army following the disastrous Battle of Nashville.

In January 1865, he was assigned command of a division comprising his brigade and that of Mathew Ector in the Department of the Gulf and the Department of Alabama, Mississippi, and Eastern Louisiana. Subsequently, Holtzclaw assumed command of the garrison at Spanish Fort and led the defenses of Mobile and Montgomery against Union forces. Following the collapse of the Confederacy, he was paroled on May 10 in Meridian, Mississippi, and formally pardoned on November 4.

== Postbellum activities ==
Holtzclaw resumed his legal career in the firm of Judge & Holtzclaw in Montgomery and became prominent in the local and state Democratic Party. He took an interest in the railroad industry and served as an associate state railroad commissioner shortly before his death. He was also the grand commander of the local chapter of the Freemasons.

James T. Holtzclaw died at his home in Montgomery at the age of sixty.

== See also ==
- List of American Civil War generals (Confederate)
