= Battle of Perryville order of battle: Union =

The following Union Army units and commanders fought in the Battle of Perryville of the American Civil War. Order of battle compiled from the army organization during the battle and return of casualties. The Confederate order of battle is listed separately.

== Abbreviations used ==
=== Military rank ===
- MG = Major General
- BG = Brigadier General
- Col = Colonel
- Ltc = Lieutenant Colonel
- Maj = Major
- Cpt = Captain
- Lt = 1st Lieutenant
- 2Lt = 2nd Lieutenant
- Sgt = Sergeant
- Bvt = Brevet

=== Artillery ===
- 10-pdr Par = 10-pounder Parrott rifle
- 12-pdr How = M1841 12-pounder howitzer
- 12-pdr Mtn = M1841 mountain howitzer
- 12-pdr Nap = M1857 12-pounder Napoleon
- 24-pdr How = M1841 24-pounder howitzer
- 3" R = 3-inch Ordnance rifle
- 6-pdr SB = M1841 6-pounder field gun
- Jam R = 14-pounder James rifle
- How = howitzer
- pdr = pound (projectile weight)
- R = rifled gun
- SB = smoothbore gun

=== Other ===
- w = wounded
- mw = mortally wounded
- k = killed
- c = captured
- m = missing

== Army of the Ohio ==
55,000 men, 147 guns (k-889, w-2966, m-433 = 4,288)

MG Don Carlos Buell, Commanding
MG George Henry Thomas, second in command

Escort:

- Anderson Troop, Pennsylvania Cavalry: 2Lt Thomas S. Maple
- 4th US Cavalry (Companies B, C, D, G, I, & K): Ltc James Oakes

Signal detachment: Cpt Jesse Merrill

=== I Corps ===
13,000 men, 38 guns (k-695, w-2290, m-346 = 3,331)

MG Alexander McDowell McCook

- Chief of Staff: Ltc James Vote Bomford (w)

| Division | Brigade | Regiments and Others |
|---|---|---|
| Third Division; 24 guns, k-494, w-1517, m-148 = 2,159 BG Lovell Harrison Rousseau Escort: 1st Michigan Engineers & Mechanics (Companies A, C, & H): Maj Enos Hopkins; 2nd Kentucky Cavalry (6 companies): Col Buckner Board | 9th Brigade k-142, w-427, m-39 = 608 Col Leonard A. Harris | 38th Indiana: Col Benjamin Franklin Scribner (w); 2nd Ohio: Ltc John Kell; 33rd Ohio: Ltc Oscar Fitzallen Moore (w); 94th Ohio: Col Joseph Washington Frizell; 10th Wisconsin: Col Alfred Rose Chapin; 5th Indiana Battery Light Artillery [2 6-pdr M1841 Jam R, 2 12-pdr How, 2 6-pdr SB]: Cpt Peter Simonson |
| Third Division; 24 guns, k-494, w-1517, m-148 = 2,159 BG Lovell Harrison Rousseau Escort: 1st Michigan Engineers & Mechanics (Companies A, C, & H): Maj Enos Hopkins; 2nd Kentucky Cavalry (6 companies): Col Buckner Board | 17th Brigade k-187, w-614, m-35 = 836 Col William Haines Lytle (w/c); Col Curran Pope (w) | 42nd Indiana: Col James Garrard Jones; 88th Indiana: Col George Humphrey; 15th Kentucky: Col Curran Pope (w), Ltc George Payne Jouett (mw); 3rd Ohio: Col John Beatty; 10th Ohio: Ltc Joseph Walter Burke; 1st Michigan Light Artillery, Battery "A" [6 10-pdr Par]: Cpt Cyrus Orlando Loomis |
| Third Division; 24 guns, k-494, w-1517, m-148 = 2,159 BG Lovell Harrison Rousseau Escort: 1st Michigan Engineers & Mechanics (Companies A, C, & H): Maj Enos Hopkins; 2nd Kentucky Cavalry (6 companies): Col Buckner Board | 28th Brigade k-165, w-458, m-70 = 693 Col John Converse Starkweather | 24th Illinois: Cpt August Mauff; 79th Pennsylvania: Col Henry Augustus Hambright; 1st Wisconsin: Ltc George B. Bingham; 21st Wisconsin: Col Benjamin Jeffrey Sweet (w); 4th Indiana Battery Light Artillery [2 6-pdr M1841 Jam R, 2 6-pdr SB, 2 12-pdr How]: Cpt Asahel Kidder Bush; 1st Kentucky Light Artillery, Battery "A" [2 6-pdr M1841 Jam R, 2 6-pdr SB, 2 10-pdr Par]: Cpt David C. Stone |
| Tenth Division; 14 guns, k-201, w-773, m-198 = 1,172 BG James Streshly Jackson (k); Col Albert Sereno Hall | 33rd Brigade k-112, w-356, m-59 = 527 BG William Rufus Terrill (mw) Escort: Terrill's Guards & Scouts: Cpt Louis Christman | Garrard's Detachment (7th Kentucky, 1 company; 32nd Kentucky, 1 company; 3rd Tennessee, 1 company): Col Theophilus Toulmin Garrard; 80th Illinois: Col Thomas G. Allen (w); 123rd Illinois: Col James Monroe; 101st Indiana: Col William Garver [not engaged; supply train guard]; 105th Ohio: Col Albert Sereno Hall, Ltc William R. Tolles; Battery D, 1st Ohio Light Artillery [1 section, attached to Parsons' Battery]: 2Lt Nathaniel M. Newell; Parsons' Independent Battery [5 12-pdr Nap, 2 12-pdr How, 1 10-pdr Par]: Lt Charles Carroll Parsons |
| Tenth Division; 14 guns, k-201, w-773, m-198 = 1,172 BG James Streshly Jackson (k); Col Albert Sereno Hall | 34th Brigade k-89, w-417, m-139 = 645 Col George P. Webster (k); Ltc Silas A. Strickland | 80th Indiana: Ltc Lewis Brooks; 50th Ohio: Col Jonah R. Taylor, Ltc Silas A. Strickland; 98th Ohio: Ltc Christian L. Poorman; 121st Ohio: Col William Pitt Reid; 19th Indiana Battery Light Artillery [4 12-pdr How, 2 3" R]: Cpt Samuel J. Harris |

=== II Corps ===
20,000 men, 65 guns (k-2, w-4, m-6 = 12)

MG Thomas Leonidas Crittenden

Escort:

- 1st Michigan Engineers & Mechanics (Companies B, E, I, & K): Col William Power Innes
- 1st Ohio Cavalry (4 companies): Maj James Laughlin
- 3rd Ohio Cavalry (4 companies): Maj John Howard Foster

| Division | Brigade | Regiments and Others |
|---|---|---|
| Fourth Division; 27 guns, k-0, w-0, m-0 = 0 BG William Sooy Smith Escort: 2nd Kentucky Cavalry (4 companies): Ltc Thomas Cochran | 10th Brigade Col William Grose | 84th Illinois: Col Louis H. Waters; 36th Indiana: Ltc Oliver Hazard Perry Cary; 23rd Kentucky: Ltc John P. Jackson; 6th Ohio: Col Nicholas Longworth Anderson; 24th Ohio: Ltc Frederick C. Jones; 4th US Light Artillery, Battery "H" [4 12-pdr Nap, 2 10-pdr Par]: Bvt Lt Samuel Canby; 4th US Light Artillery, Battery "M" [2 sections; 2 12-pdr Nap, 2 24-pdr How]: Cpt John Mendenhall |
| Fourth Division; 27 guns, k-0, w-0, m-0 = 0 BG William Sooy Smith Escort: 2nd Kentucky Cavalry (4 companies): Ltc Thomas Cochran | 19th Brigade Col William Babcock Hazen | 110th Illinois: Col Thomas S. Casey; 9th Indiana: Col William H. Blake; 6th Kentucky: Col Walter Chiles Whitaker; 27th Kentucky: Col Charles D. Pennebaker; 41st Ohio: Col George S. Mygatt; 1st Ohio Light Artillery, Battery "F" [6 12-pdr How, 5 6-pdr M1841 Jam R]: Cpt Daniel T. Cockerill |
| Fourth Division; 27 guns, k-0, w-0, m-0 = 0 BG William Sooy Smith Escort: 2nd Kentucky Cavalry (4 companies): Ltc Thomas Cochran | 22nd Brigade BG Charles Cruft | 31st Indiana: Col John Osborn; 1st Kentucky: Ltc David A. Enyart; 2nd Kentucky: Col Thomas D. Sedgewick; 20th Kentucky: Ltc Charles S. Hanson; 90th Ohio: Col Isaac N. Ross; 1st Ohio Light Artillery, Battery "B" [4 6-pdr M1841 Jam R, 2 6-pdr SB]: Cpt William E. Standart |
| Fifth Division; 18 guns, k-0, w-0, m-0 = 0 BG Horatio Phillips Van Cleve | 11th Brigade Col Samuel Beatty | 79th Indiana: Col Frederick Knefler; 9th Kentucky: Ltc George Henry Cram; 13th Kentucky: Ltc John B. Carlisle; 19th Ohio: Ltc Elliott Woodbridge Hollingsworth; 59th Ohio: Col James P. Fyffe; 7th Indiana Battery Light Artillery [2 12-pdr How, 4 10-pdr Par]: Cpt George Ransom Swallow |
| Fifth Division; 18 guns, k-0, w-0, m-0 = 0 BG Horatio Phillips Van Cleve | 14th Brigade Col Pierce Butler Hawkins | 44th Indiana: Col Hugh B. Reed; 86th Indiana: Col Orville S. Hamilton; 11th Kentucky: Ltc Smoloff Pallas Love; 26th Kentucky: Col Cicero Maxwell; 13th Ohio: Col Joseph C. Hawkins; Battery B, Pennsylvania Light Artillery [6 6-pdr SB]: Lt Alanson Stevens |
| Fifth Division; 18 guns, k-0, w-0, m-0 = 0 BG Horatio Phillips Van Cleve | 23rd Brigade Col Stanley Matthews | 35th Indiana: Col Bernard Francis Mullen; 8th Kentucky: Col Sidney M. Barnes; 21st Kentucky: Col Samuel Woodson Price; 51st Ohio: Ltc Richard W. McClain; 99th Ohio: Ltc John E. Cummins; 3rd Wisconsin Battery Light Artillery [4 10-pdr Par, 2 12 pdr How]: Cpt Lucius H. Drury |
| Sixth Division; 18 guns, k-0, w-0, m-2 = 2 BG Thomas John Wood | 15th Brigade k-0, w-0, m-0 = 0 BG Milo Smith Hascall | 100th Illinois: Col Frederick Bartleson; 17th Indiana: Ltc George W. Gorman; 58th Indiana: Col George Pearson Buell; 3rd Kentucky: Ltc William Scott; 26th Ohio: Maj Christopher M. Degenfeld; 8th Indiana Battery Light Artillery [2 12-pdr How, 4 10-pdr Par]: Lt George Estep |
| Sixth Division; 18 guns, k-0, w-0, m-2 = 2 BG Thomas John Wood | 20th Brigade k-0, w-0, m-0 = 0 Col Charles Garrison Harker | 51st Indiana: Col Abel D. Streight; 73rd Indiana: Col Gilbert Hathaway; 13th Michigan: Ltc Frederick William Wordon; 64th Ohio: Col John Ferguson; 65th Ohio: Ltc William Young; 6th Ohio Light Artillery [2 12-pdr How, 4 10-pdr Par]: Cpt Cullen Bradley |
| Sixth Division; 18 guns, k-0, w-0, m-2 = 2 BG Thomas John Wood | 21st Brigade k-0, w-0, m-2 = 2 Col George Day Wagner | 15th Indiana: Ltc Gustavus Adolphus Wood; 40th Indiana: Col John Wesley Blake; 57th Indiana: Col Cyrus Cooke Hines; 24th Kentucky: Col Lewis Braxton Grigsby; 97th Ohio: Col John Quincy Lane; 10th Indiana Battery Light Artillery [2 12-pdr How, 4 10-pdr Par]: Cpt Jerome B. Cox |
| Cavalry | McCook's Cavalry Brigade k-2, w-4, m-4 = 10 Col Edward Moody McCook | 2nd Indiana Cavalry: Ltc Robert Reed Stewart; 1st Kentucky Cavalry: Col Frank Lane Wolford; 3rd Kentucky Cavalry: Col Eli Houston Murray; 7th Pennsylvania Cavalry, 1st Battalion: Maj John Estill Wynkoop; 4th US Light Artillery, Battery "M" [1 section; 2 12-pdr Nap]: Lt Henry Alonzo Huntington |

=== III Corps ===
22,000 men, 44 guns (k-192, w-672, m-80 = 944)

MG Charles Champion Gilbert

| Division | Brigade | Regiments and Others |
|---|---|---|
| First Division; 14 guns, k-4, w-14, m-7 = 25 BG Albin Francisco Schoepf Escort: 1st Ohio Cavalry (6 companies): Col Minor Millikin | 1st Brigade k-0, w-0, m-0 = 0 Col Moses B. Walker | 82nd Indiana: Col Morton Craig Hunter; 12th Kentucky: Col William Hoskins; 17th Ohio: Col John M. Connell; 31st Ohio: Ltc Frederick William Lister; 38th Ohio: Ltc William Alden Choate; 1st Michigan Light Artillery, Battery "D" [2 12-pdr How, 2 6-pdr M1841 R]: Cpt Josiah W. Church |
| First Division; 14 guns, k-4, w-14, m-7 = 25 BG Albin Francisco Schoepf Escort: 1st Ohio Cavalry (6 companies): Col Minor Millikin | 2nd Brigade k-4, w-7, m-0 = 11 BG Speed Smith Fry | 10th Indiana: Col William Coalbaugh Kise; 74th Indiana: Col Charles Warner Chapman; 4th Kentucky: Col John Thomas Croxton; 10th Kentucky: Ltc William Hercules Hays; 14th Ohio: Ltc George P. Este; 1st Ohio Light Artillery, Battery "C" [2 12-pdr How, 4 6-pdr M1841 Jam R]: Cpt Daniel K. Southwick |
| First Division; 14 guns, k-4, w-14, m-7 = 25 BG Albin Francisco Schoepf Escort: 1st Ohio Cavalry (6 companies): Col Minor Millikin | 3rd Brigade k-0, w-7, m-7 = 14 BG James Blair Steedman | 87th Indiana: Col Kline Godfrey Shryock; 2nd Minnesota: Col James George; 9th Ohio: Ltc Charles Joseph; 35th Ohio: Col Ferdinand Van Derveer; 18th US: Maj Frederick Townsend; 4th US Light Artillery, Battery "I" [4 12-pdr How]: Lt Frank G. Smith |
| Ninth Division; 16 guns, k-133, w-356, m-58 = 547 BG Robert Byington Mitchell Escort: Sherer's Independent Cavalry Company: Cpt Samuel B. Sherer; 2nd Kansas Cavalry (detachment, 150 men): Sgt Hugh Quinn | 30th Brigade k-133, w-344, m-58 = 535 Col Michael Gooding (w/c) | 59th Illinois: Maj Joshua Carroll Winters; 74th Illinois: Col James B. Kerr (not engaged; supply train guard); 75th Illinois: Ltc John E. Bennett; 22nd Indiana: Ltc Squire Isham Keith (k); 5th Wisconsin Battery Light Artillery [2 10-pdr Par, 2 12-pdr How, 2 12-pdr Mtn]: Cpt Oscar F. Pinney |
| Ninth Division; 16 guns, k-133, w-356, m-58 = 547 BG Robert Byington Mitchell Escort: Sherer's Independent Cavalry Company: Cpt Samuel B. Sherer; 2nd Kansas Cavalry (detachment, 150 men): Sgt Hugh Quinn | 31st Brigade k-0, w-11, m-0 = 11 Col William Passmore Carlin | 21st Illinois: Col John Washington Shields Alexander; 38th Illinois: Maj Daniel H. Gilmer; 101st Ohio: Col Leander Stem; 15th Wisconsin: Col Hans Christian Heg; 2nd Minnesota Battery Light Artillery [2 sections; 4 12-pdr How]: Lt Richard L. Dawley |
| Ninth Division; 16 guns, k-133, w-356, m-58 = 547 BG Robert Byington Mitchell Escort: Sherer's Independent Cavalry Company: Cpt Samuel B. Sherer; 2nd Kansas Cavalry (detachment, 150 men): Sgt Hugh Quinn | 32nd Brigade k-0, w-1, m-0 = 1 Col William Wallace Caldwell | 25th Illinois: Ltc James McClelland; 35th Illinois: Ltc William P. Chandler; 81st Indiana: Ltc John Timberlake; 8th Kansas (5 companies): Ltc John Alexander Martin; 8th Wisconsin Battery Light Artillery [2 12-pdr Nap, 4 3" R]: Cpt Stephen J. Carpenter |
| Eleventh Division; 12 guns, k-51, w-288, m-14 = 353 BG Philip Henry Sheridan Escort: Company L, 2nd Kentucky Cavalry: | 35th Brigade k-22, w-102, m-1 = 125 Ltc Bernard Laiboldt | 44th Illinois: Cpt Wallace W. Barrett; 73rd Illinois: Col James F. Jaquess; 2nd Missouri: Cpt Walter Hoppe (k); 15th Missouri: Maj John Weber |
| Eleventh Division; 12 guns, k-51, w-288, m-14 = 353 BG Philip Henry Sheridan Escort: Company L, 2nd Kentucky Cavalry: | 36th Brigade k-8, w-62, m-9 = 79 Col Daniel McCook, Jr. | 85th Illinois: Col Robert S. Moore; 86th Illinois: Col David D. Irons; 125th Illinois: Col Oscar Fitzalan Harmon; 52nd Ohio: Ltc Daniel D. T. Cowen |
| Eleventh Division; 12 guns, k-51, w-288, m-14 = 353 BG Philip Henry Sheridan Escort: Company L, 2nd Kentucky Cavalry: | 37th Brigade k-21, w-118, m-4 = 143 Col Nicholas Greusel | 36th Illinois: Cpt Silas Miller; 88th Illinois: Col Francis Trowbridge Sherman; 21st Michigan: Col Ambrose A. Stevens (w); 24th Wisconsin: Col Charles Hathaway Larrabee |
| Eleventh Division; 12 guns, k-51, w-288, m-14 = 353 BG Philip Henry Sheridan Escort: Company L, 2nd Kentucky Cavalry: | Artillery | 2nd Illinois Light Artillery, Battery "I" [2 12-pdr Nap, 2 10-pdr Par, 2 6-pdr M1841 Jam R]: Cpt Charles M. Barnett; 1st Missouri Light Artillery, Battery "G" [4 12-pdr Nap, 2 10-pdr Par]: Cpt Henry Hescock |
| Cavalry | Gay's Cavalry Brigade k-4, w-14, m-1 = 19 Cpt Ebenezer Gay | 9th Kentucky Cavalry (Companies A, B, D, F, H, I, K, & M): Ltc John Boyle; 2nd Michigan Cavalry: Ltc Archibald P. Campbell (w); 9th Pennsylvania Cavalry: Ltc Thomas Chalkley James; 2nd Minnesota Battery Light Artillery [1 section; 2 12-pdr How]: Cpt William A. Hotchkiss |

== See also ==
- Kentucky in the American Civil War
