= 13th Tennessee Infantry Regiment =

Infantry regiment of the Confederate States Army

The 13th Tennessee Infantry Regiment, commonly known as the "Thirteenth Tennessee", was a line infantry formation of the Confederate States Army in the Western Theater of the American Civil War.

== History ==
The regiment saw service at the battles of Shiloh, Chickamauga, and Franklin. Company I captured the national colors of the 57th Indiana Infantry Regiment at the Battle of Franklin on November 30, 1864. It was returned to the 57th Indiana at their reunion in Kokomo on September 23, 1885.

== Regimental order of battle ==
Units of the 13th Tennessee Infantry Regiment included:

- Company A - Captains S.R. Brewer, F.H. Carter - "The Fayette Rifle Grays" - Fayette County.
- Company B - Captains Joe L. Cranberry, Ben F. Lightle, William G. Mehane - "The Macon Grays" - Fayette County.
- Company C - Captains John H. Morgan, E.W. Douglass, W.D. Harrison - "The Secession Guards" - Shelby County.
- Company D - Captains John A. Wilkins, S.R. Brewer - "The Yorkville Rifles" - Gibson County.
- Company E - Captains Alfred J. Vaughan, Jr., Beverly L. Dyer, Johna A. Moody - "ThevDixie Rifles" - Fayette County.
- Company F - Captains John V. Wright, Dew Moore Wisdon, G.W. Churchwell - "The Wright Boys" - McNairy County.
- Company G - Captains W.E. Winfield, C.D. Palmore, R.F. Lanier - "The Gain's Invincibles" - Fayette County.
- Company H - Captain Robert W. Pitman, Sylvester A. Munson - "The Yancey Riflemen" - Fayette County.
- Company I - Captains G.L. Ross, William Jere Crook, John R. Purdy - "The Forked Deer Volunteers" - Henderson County, now Chester County.
- Company K - Captains Samuel L. Latta, Joseh Rucks Hibbitt, Ausburn D. Brown - "The Dyer Grays" - Dyer County.
- Company L - Captains C.B. Jones, Richard E. Moody - "The Zollicoffer Avengers."

== Field Officers ==
- Colonels-John V. Wright, Alfred J. Vaughn, Jr., Robert W. Pitman.
- Lieutenant Colonels-Alfred J. Vaughn, Jr., William E. Morgan, Robert W. Pitman, Beverly L. Dyer.
- Majors-W. E. Winfield, William Jere Crook, Peter H. Cole, Beverly L. Dyer.

== See also ==
- List of Confederate units from Tennessee

== Bibliography ==
- Vaughan, A. J. (1897). Personal Record of the Thirteenth Regiment, Tennessee Infantry. Memphis: Press of S. C. Toof & Co. OCLC 1050721781 – via Internet Archive.
