= 4th Tennessee Infantry Regiment =

Infantry regiment of the Confederate States Army

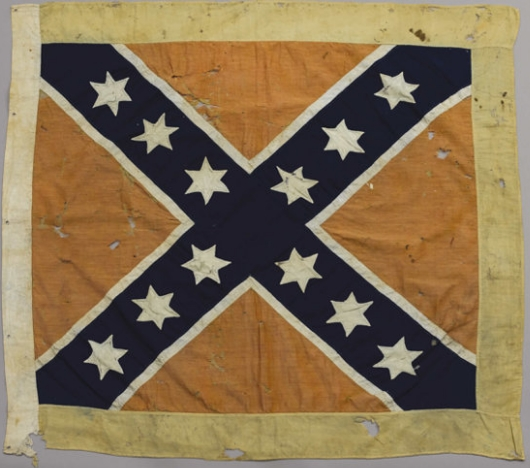
- Regimental color of the Fourth Tennessee
- Active: 1861–1865
- Disbanded: May 1, 1865
- Country: Confederate States
- Allegiance: Tennessee
- Branch: Army
- Type: Infantry
- Size: Regiment
- Nickname(s): "Neely's regiment"
- Facings: Light blue
- Battles: American Civil War; Battle of Shiloh; Siege of Corinth; Battle of Perryville; Battle of Murfreesboro; Battle of Chickamauga; Battle of Missionary Ridge; Battle of Atlanta; Battle of Jonesborough

The 4th Tennessee Infantry Regiment, also known as the "Neely's regiment", was an infantry formation of the Confederate States Army in the Western Theater of the American Civil War.

== History ==
Organized at Germantown, Tennessee, the 4th Tennessee Infantry Regiment was accepted into Confederate service on August 16, 1861. In just over six months the regiment would lose almost half of its effective forces at the Battle of Shiloh with Brigadier-General Charles Clark's division. While Colonel Rufus P. Neely would be commended for his bravery at Shiloh, the casualties included Major John F. Henry. However, Neely would die soon thereafter in May 1862. After the siege at Corinth and the Battle of Perryville, the regiment was so decimated by the time of the Battle of Murfreesboro that it was consolidated with the 5th Tennessee to form the 4th/5th Tennessee Infantry regiments. Forming the right wing of Alexander Stewart's Brigade, the regiment was honored in their capture of many federal pieces during the battle. Chickamauga, Missionary Ridge, Atlanta and Jonesboro, Georgia would follow. Surviving members of the regiment were paroled at Greensboro, North Carolina, on May 1, 1865.

== See also ==
- List of Tennessee Confederate Civil War units
