= 47th Tennessee Infantry Regiment =

- State Flag of Tennessee
- Active: December 16, 1861 - April 1865
- Country: Confederate States of America
- Allegiance: Confederate
- Branch: Confederate States Army
- Type: Infantry
- Engagements: Battle of Shiloh; Battle of Richmond; Battle of Murfreesboro; Battle of Chickamauga; Battle of Chattanooga; Atlanta Campaign; Battle of Nashville; Battle of Franklin; Carolinas Campaign; Battle of Bentonville

The 47th Tennessee Infantry Regiment was an infantry regiment from Tennessee that served with the Confederate States Army in the American Civil War. Notable battles the regiment was involved in include Shiloh.

== Organization ==
The regiment was mustered into service at Camp Trenton, Tennessee, on December 16, 1861.

The companies of the regiment were recruited from:

- Company A, enlisted at Troy, Obion County.
- Company B, enlisted at Donaldson, Gibson County. It consisted of men from Dyer and Gibson County.
- Company C, enlisted at Dyersburg and Dyer County.
- Company D, enlisted at Dyersburg.
- Company E enlisted at Dyersburg.
- Company F, enlisted at Humboldt, Gibson County.
- Company G enlisted at Trenton.
- Company H, enlisted in Kenton, on the Obion, Gibson County.
- Company I enlisted from Troy.
- Company K enlisted at Yorkville, Gibson County

== Service ==
=== Early service ===
The regiment remained at Camp Trenton for some time, conducting drilling duties. The equipment of the regiment initially consisted of equipment the men brought from home, hunting rifles, and shotguns. Later, however, Colonel Hill distributed 350 .58 caliber rifles from an armory in Trenton. On April 5, 1862, would move to Pittsburg Landing, before taking part in the Battle of Shiloh (April 6-7). The regiment arrived as the only reinforcements Beauregard received, which didn't arrived to the battlefield until 8:00 AM.It lost 5 killed, 61 wounded, and one missing out of their 731 engaged.

=== Confederate Heartland Offensive and Stones River ===
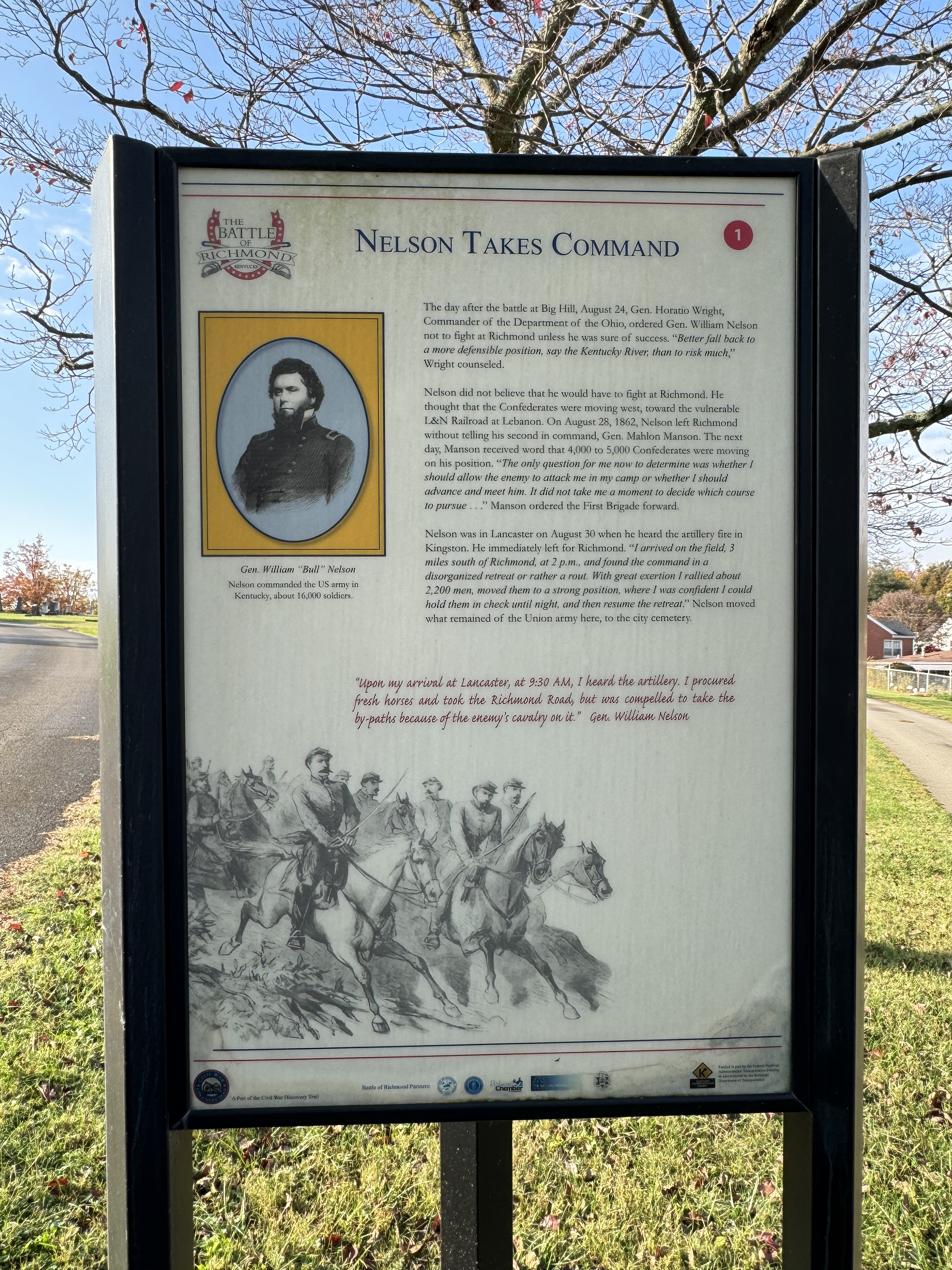
The cemetery marker Battle for Richmond, in which the regiment took part.

On May 26, at Corinth, Mississippi, the regiment was attached to Johnson's Brigade, Clark's Division of Leonidas Polk's Corps and left Corinth on May 29 to Tupelo, Mississippi, remaining there until July 25, when they moved to Knoxville to join General Kirby Smith's invasion of Kentucky, it was reported that the regiment marched barefoot, and would later take part in the Battle of Richmond, Kentucky (August 29–30, 1862), where they lost 8 killed and 24 wounded.

From Richmond, it marched from Lexington, through Paris, to Perryville, where it was present in the Battle of Perryville (October 8, 1862) but wasn't engaged, and after the battle, it would retreat from Harrodsburg, Kentucky, to Knoxville. In Knoxville, the 12th Tennessee and 47th Tennessee were consolidated, and would move to Chattanooga via railroad. The regiment would leave Chattanooga on November 1, 1862. It would move to Murfreesboro, where the regiment would initially conduct picket duty at LaVergne for two weeks before returning to Murfreesboro on December 22. The regiment would later take part in the Battle of Murfreesboro. During the battle, the regiment was commanded by Captain W. Watkins and lost 86 of its 263 engaged.

=== Battle of Chickamauga ===
Following Murfreesboro, the regiment withdrew to Shelbyville on January 14, conducting provost duty there. On April 1, 1863, the 12th/47th Consolidated regiment was attached to Smith's Brigade, Cheatham's Division, under Polk's Corps, the regiment left Shelbyville on June 27 and would take part in the Battle of Chickamauga (September 18–20, 1863), fighting around Lee and Gordon's Mill, driving Union forces back, but due to their ammunition running low, having expended 14,350 rounds of ammunition, they were replaced by General Strahl's brigade, which would later fall back, and later repulse another attack by Union forces. During the battle, the regiment lost 87 men.

During a night-time assault, Smith's brigade was ordered to support Deshler, but due to low visibility over the darkness, Preston Smith had mistaken Union forces, believing that they were confederates, and was killed. However, the Union troops discovered that they were directly in the main Confederate formation, coupled with them being heavily outgunned, the union forces yieled. The 12th/47th and 13th/154th captured over 400 prisoners, including the colors of the 77th Pennsylvania, which Col. Vaughan sent it to the rear.

During the battle, the regiment lost 2 officers, and 6 men killed, alongside 76 men wounded. Those officers killed were Captain John Duncan of Company H and Captain James Watkins of Company D.

=== Missionary Ridge ===
Following the battle, the regiment remained in the Chattanooga Valley until October, when it moved to Missionary Ridge and was transferred to General T. C. Hindman's Division. The regiment would take part in the Battle of Missionary Ridge (November 25, 1863), and after the battle, retreated to Dalton, Georgia, on November 27, establishing winter quarters, with no tents, and small amounts of rations. On December 13, the 12th/47th reported that it had 281 effectives, and on January 18, 1864, would re-enlist, along with Strahl's Brigade.

On February 20, Strahl's brigade would be transferred back to Cheatam's Division, and the regiment would take part in an expedition to reinforce General Polk's army in Mississippi. The regiment would leave Dalton on February 16, moving to Demopolis, Alabama, before returning to Dalton.

=== Later service ===
The regiment would later take part in the Atlanta Campaign and would fight its last engagement at Bentonville, North Carolina.

The regiment surrendered in April 1865, with only remnants of the regiment remaining, about 16 men surrendering.

== Commanders ==
- Colonel Munson R. Hill
- Colonel William M. Watkins
- Lieutenant Colonel B. E. Holmes
- Lieutenant Colonel Vincent C. Wynne
- Major Thomas R. Shearon

== See also ==
- List of Tennessee Confederate Civil War units
