= Alfred Jefferson Vaughan Jr. =

Confederate Army general (1830–1899)

Alfred J. Vaughan Jr.
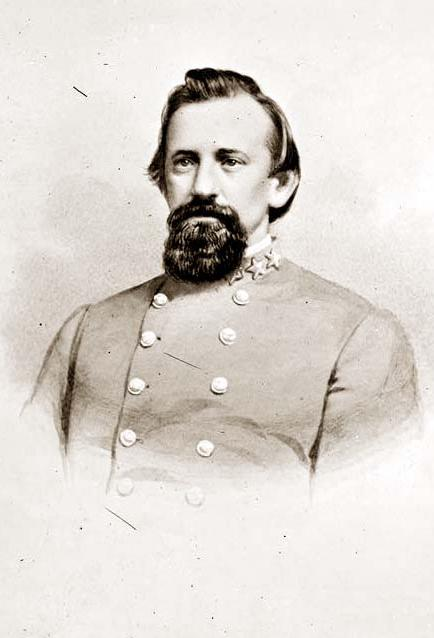
- Alfred J. Vaughan Jr.
- Born: May 10, 1830; Dinwiddie County, Virginia
- Died: October 1, 1899 (aged 69); Indianapolis, Indiana
- Burial place: Elmwood Cemetery Memphis, Tennessee
- Military career
- Allegiance: Confederate States of America
- Branch: Confederate States Army
- Service years: 1861–65
- Rank: Brigadier General
- Conflicts: American Civil War

Alfred Jefferson Vaughan Jr. (May 10, 1830 – October 1, 1899) was an American civil engineer, planter, soldier, and writer. He served as a Confederate general during the American Civil War, in which he was wounded twice, and fought mainly in the Western Theater of the conflict.

After the war Vaughan resumed farming, was active in Confederate veteran affairs, and was a published author. He also was part of the early formation of the Grange Movement in the United States.

== Early life and career ==
Alfred J. Vaughan Jr. was born in 1830 in Dinwiddie County, Virginia, a son of Alfred Jefferson Vaughan and his wife Dorothy. He entered the Virginia Military Institute (VMI) on July 17, 1848, and graduated 15th in a class of 29 cadets on July 4, 1851. Throughout his final year he served as "a cadet captain and company commander". While attending VMI, Vaughan was a classmate of William Y.C. Humes, who stood 2nd in the class and would also serve as a Confederate general in the Civil War.

Vaughan took up civil engineering as his chosen profession, and initially moved to Saint Joseph, Missouri, working as a surveyor for the Hannibal and St. Joseph Railroad. Soon afterward he relocated to Southern California, where he served as deputy U.S. surveyor. He then briefly was on the staff of an official for the Northern Pacific Railroad. In this work Vaughan served as the private secretary of Alfred Cumming (uncle of Confederate general Alfred Cumming) who represented the railway in peace treaty talks with the Indians living on the upper portion of the Missouri River.

Finally settling in Marshall County, Mississippi, Vaughan took up work as a farmer. There he met Martha Jane Hardaway (1838–1911) and they were married on November 6, 1856, having eight children together. He was still working as a planter in Marshall County when the war began in 1861.

== Civil War service ==
When the Civil War began in 1861, Vaughan chose to follow his home and adopted states and the Confederate cause, despite his strong Unionist feelings. He raised a company of fellow Mississippians for service, however the state was unable to arm and equip them, so Vaughan led them north to Moscow, Tennessee. There his men (dubbed the "Dixie Rifles") were added to the 13th Tennessee Infantry Regiment, and Vaughan entered the Confederate Army as its captain that May. That June the regiment was reorganized, and on June 7 he was elected its lieutenant colonel.

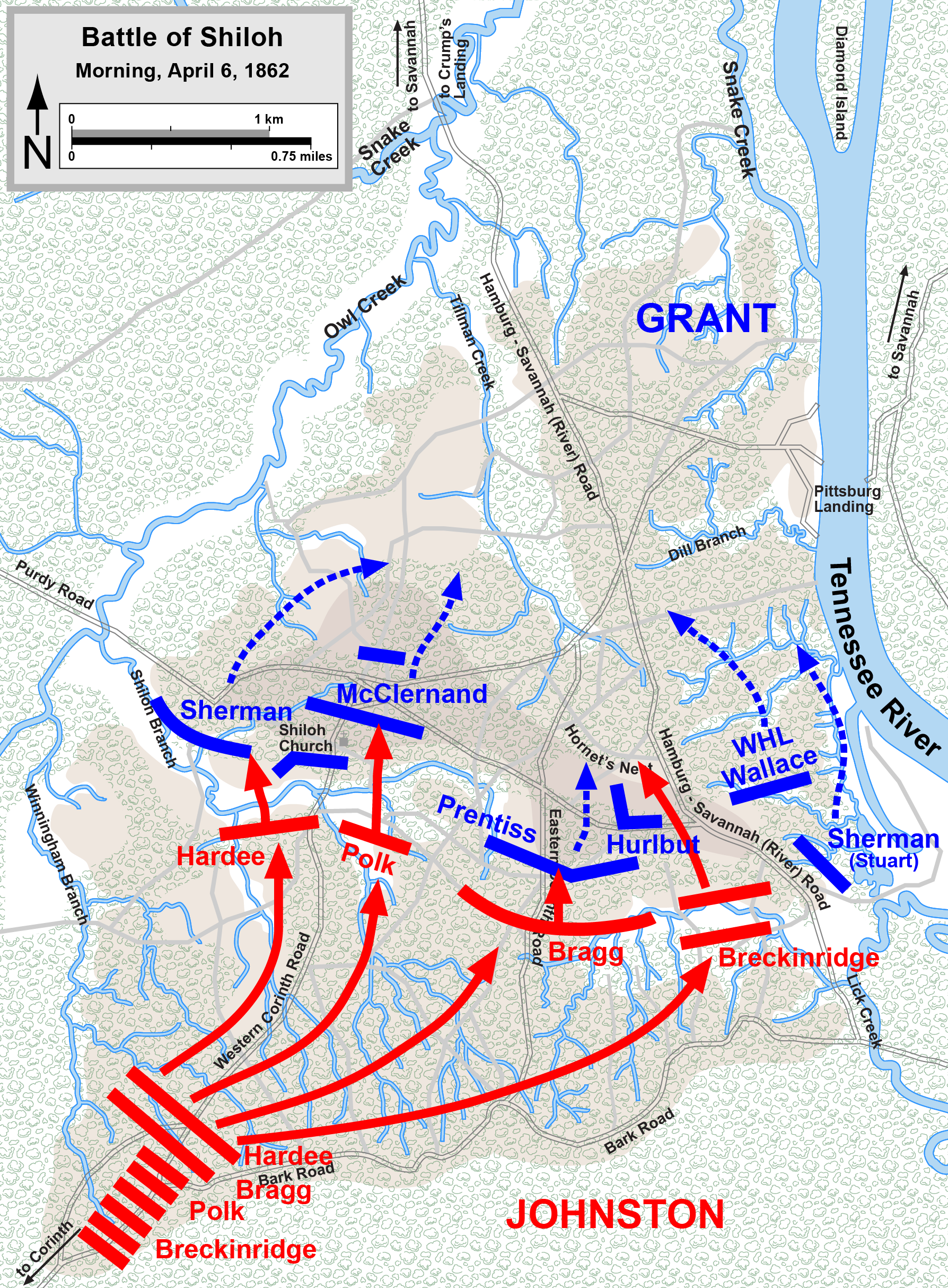
Battle of Shiloh, actions of April 6, 1862

Vaughan and his regiment first saw action during the Battle of Belmont on November 7, 1861. On December 4 he was promoted to colonel and was given command of the 13th Tennessee. He then fought during the Battle of Shiloh on April 6–7, 1862, and was lightly wounded on the first day of the battle. Vaughan's conduct in this fight has been described as: " ...he led his troops in a charge against the Union right, routing an Ohio regiment and causing a nearby battery to abandon 3 of its guns." Beginning that fall he was given brigade command in the Army of Tennessee and both its previous namings (Army of Kentucky and of Mississippi).

Recovering from the injury, Vaughan participated in the Battle of Richmond on August 29–30, and the Battle of Perryville on October 8. He also fought during the Battle of Stones River (also called the Battle of Murfreesboro) from December 31 to January 2, 1863. Vaughan's most notable service was during the Battle of Chickamauga on September 17–18, 1863, after which he was given a field promotion personally by Confederate President Jefferson Davis "for conspicuous gallantry." Vaughan was promoted to brigadier general effective November 18, 1863, "in recognition for his service to the Confederacy at Chickamauga." An account of his performance in that fight follows:

At Chickamauga he was made brigadier-general on the field, and succeeded to the command of the brigade of Preston Smith, who was killed in that battle. When he fell, Colonel Vaughan was near his side and immediately took charge of his brigade, and by skill and courage richly earned the honor bestowed upon him by the President of the Confederacy.

Atlanta campaign of 1864

During the Chattanooga campaign that followed, Vaughan fought at the Battle of Missionary Ridge on November 25, 1863. He then participated in the Atlanta campaign of 1864, and on July 4 Vaughan led his brigade during a skirmish at Vining's Station just after the Battle of Marietta on the previous day. Up to this point he had escaped serious injury, despite having at least eight horses shot from under him in combat. However, in this fight he was severely wounded when his leg was cut off by an exploding artillery shell, ending his active military service with the Confederate States. On May 10, 1865, Vaughan was paroled from Gainesville, Alabama, and returned home.

== Postbellum career and death ==
After the American Civil War ended in 1865, Vaughan returned to farming in Mississippi. In 1872 he moved to Tennessee, where into 1873 he participated in the Grange Movement at Memphis. He served as a general agent of the movement, responsible for the organization of state granges in Mississippi, Arkansas, and Tennessee. Vaughan also opened a mercantile business while in Memphis.

On November 4, 1876, Vaughan was the grand marshal at the Grand Democratic Rally at Memphis. There were 4,000 people in the torchlight procession and 10,000 people at the assembly at the Exposition Building. Other honored guests and speakers included Lucius Q. C. Lamar and former Gov. Isham Green Harris amongst other dignitaries.

In 1878 Vaughan was elected clerk of the criminal court of Shelby County, Tennessee, and was re-elected in 1882. From 1897 until his death Vaughan was the head of the United Confederate Veterans chapter in Tennessee. Also in 1897 he published his book Personal Record of the Thirteenth Regiment, Tennessee Infantry. He died two years later in Indianapolis, Indiana, and his body was returned to Memphis for burial in the city's Elmwood Cemetery.

== See also ==
- List of American Civil War generals (Confederate)
