= 14th Texas Cavalry Regiment =

Military unit

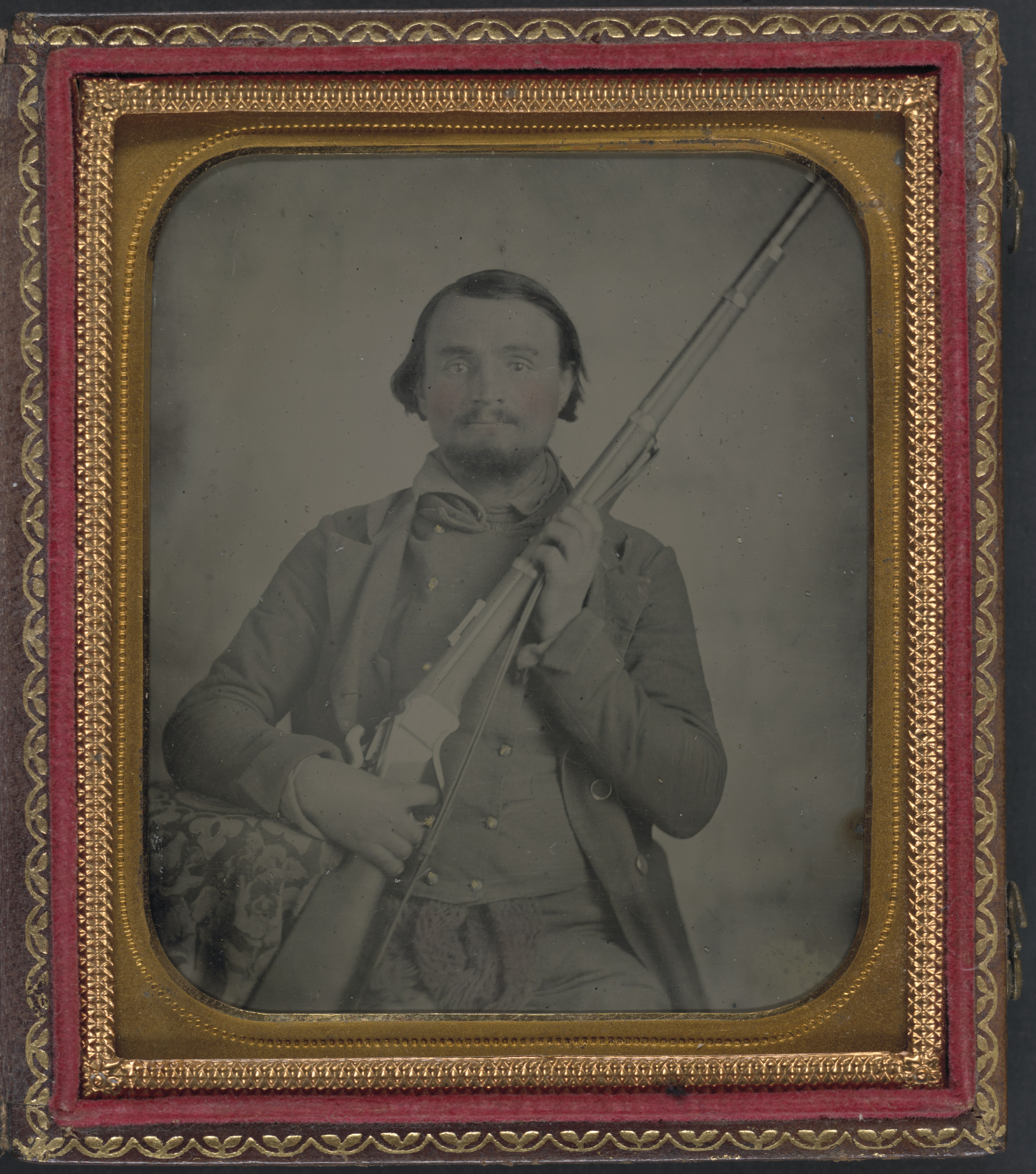
- John Alphonso Beall of Company D, 14th Texas Cavalry with Berdan Sharps rifle
- Active: Fall 1861 – 9 May 1865
- Country: Confederate States of America
- Allegiance: Confederate States of America, Texas
- Branch: Confederate States Army
- Type: Cavalry, Infantry
- Size: Regiment
- Equipment: Rifled musket
- Engagements: American Civil War; Siege of Corinth (1862); Battle of Richmond (1862); Battle of Stones River (1862–63); Battle of Chickamauga (1863); Meridian campaign (1864); Atlanta campaign (1864); Battle of Nashville (1864); Battle of Spanish Fort (1865); Battle of Fort Blakeley (1865)

Commanders
- Notable commanders: John Lafayette Camp

The 14th Texas Cavalry Regiment was a unit of mounted volunteers in the Confederate States Army that fought during the American Civil War. The regiment mustered as cavalry in the fall of 1861 but the soldiers were dismounted in March 1862 and served as infantry for the rest of the war. The regiment fought at the Siege of Corinth, and at Richmond, Ky., Stones River, and Chickamauga in 1862–1863. The unit fought in the Meridian and Atlanta campaigns and at Nashville in 1864, and at Spanish Fort and Fort Blakeley in 1865. The remaining 100 members of the regiment were paroled by Federal forces on 9 May 1865.

== See also ==
- List of Texas Civil War Confederate units
