= 12th Tennessee Infantry Regiment =

American Civil War Regiment

The 12th Regiment, Tennessee Infantry was an infantry regiment from Tennessee that served with the Confederate States Army in the American Civil War.

== Service ==
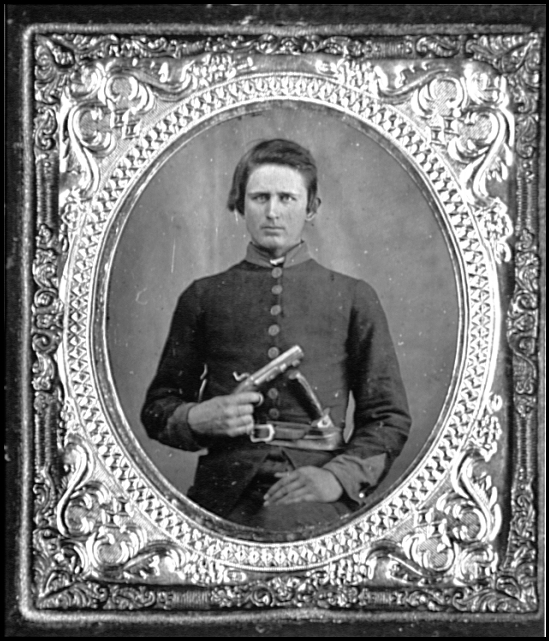
Pvt. Robert Patterson, Company D, 12th Tennessee Infantry

It was mustered in 1861, consisting mostly of men from Gibson County. Colonel Tyree Harris Bell was its second commanding officer. Robert Porter Caldwell was the major for the regiment. The regiment fought in notable battles, including the Battle of Shiloh.

== See also ==
- List of Tennessee Confederate Civil War units
