= Preston Smith (general) =

American lawyer (1823–1863)

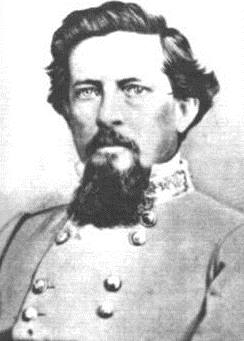
- Born: December 25, 1823; Giles County, Tennessee
- Died: September 19, 1863 (aged 39); Catoosa County, Georgia
- Burial place: Elmwood Cemetery, Memphis, Tennessee
- Military career
- Allegiance: Confederate States of America
- Branch: Confederate States Army
- Service years: 1861–1863
- Rank: Brigadier General
- Commands: Brigade in the Army of Tennessee
- Conflicts: American Civil War: Battle of Shiloh; Battle of Richmond; Battle of Perryville; Battle of Chickamauga †

Preston Smith (December 25, 1823 – September 19, 1863) was a Confederate military officer in the Confederate States Army during the American Civil War. He was killed in action during a night attack during the Battle of Chickamauga in northern Georgia.

== Biography ==
Preston Smith was born in Giles County, Tennessee. After being educated in a country school, he attended Jackson College in Columbia, Tennessee. Smith studied law, passed his bar exam, and established a practice in Columbia. He later moved to Waynesboro, Tennessee, and finally to Memphis, where his practice flourished.

In May 1861, Smith was elected as the colonel of a state militia regiment, the 154th Tennessee, which was soon mustered into the Confederate army. In April 1862, he led his regiment during the Battle of Shiloh in western Tennessee, where he was disabled from a severe wound to his right shoulder, rendering it useless and forcing Smith to turn over command to a subordinate and leave the field. He was unable to resume his command duties until the following month.

He returned in time to participate in Braxton Bragg's Kentucky Campaign. He commanded a brigade in the division of Patrick Cleburne and temporarily succeeded him in command when Cleburne was wounded during the Battle of Richmond.

On October 27, 1862, Smith received a promotion to brigadier general and was given command of a brigade in the Army of Tennessee.

=== Death at Chickamauga ===
During a night attack at Chickamauga, Smith and his staff inadvertently rode into Union lines, where he and two aides were struck down. Smith was shot by a sergeant (Bryson) of the 77th Pennsylvania Infantry, as the general chastised the NCO, mistaking him for one of his own troops His gold watch diverted a bullet that would have entered his heart, but Smith's injury was mortal. He was carried to the rear, where he died within the hour. His body was transported to Atlanta for burial. It was exhumed later and re-interred in Elmwood Cemetery in Memphis.

His divisional commander, Maj. Gen. Benjamin F. Cheatham, reported,

It was in this night attack that Brig.-Gen. Preston Smith of Tennessee received his mortal wound, from which he died in 50 minutes. At the head of his noble brigade, of which he had been the commander as colonel and brigadier-general for two years and a half, he fell in the performance of what he himself, with his expiring breath, simply said was his duty. Active, energetic and brave, with a rare fitness to command, full of honorable ambition in perfect harmony with the most elevated patriotism, the whole country will mourn his fall and do honor to his memory.

== See also ==
- List of American Civil War generals (Confederate)
