= Battle of Day's Gap =

Battle of the American Civil War

- Part of the American Civil War (Streight's Raid)
Date	April 30, 1863
Location	Cullman County, Alabama 34°18′34.56″N 87°00′39.6″W
Result	Union victory

Belligerents
United States (Union)	(Confederate States of America) CSA (Confederacy)

Commanders and leaders
(United States) Abel Streight	Nathan Bedford Forrest

Strength
1,500	600

Casualties and losses
23	65

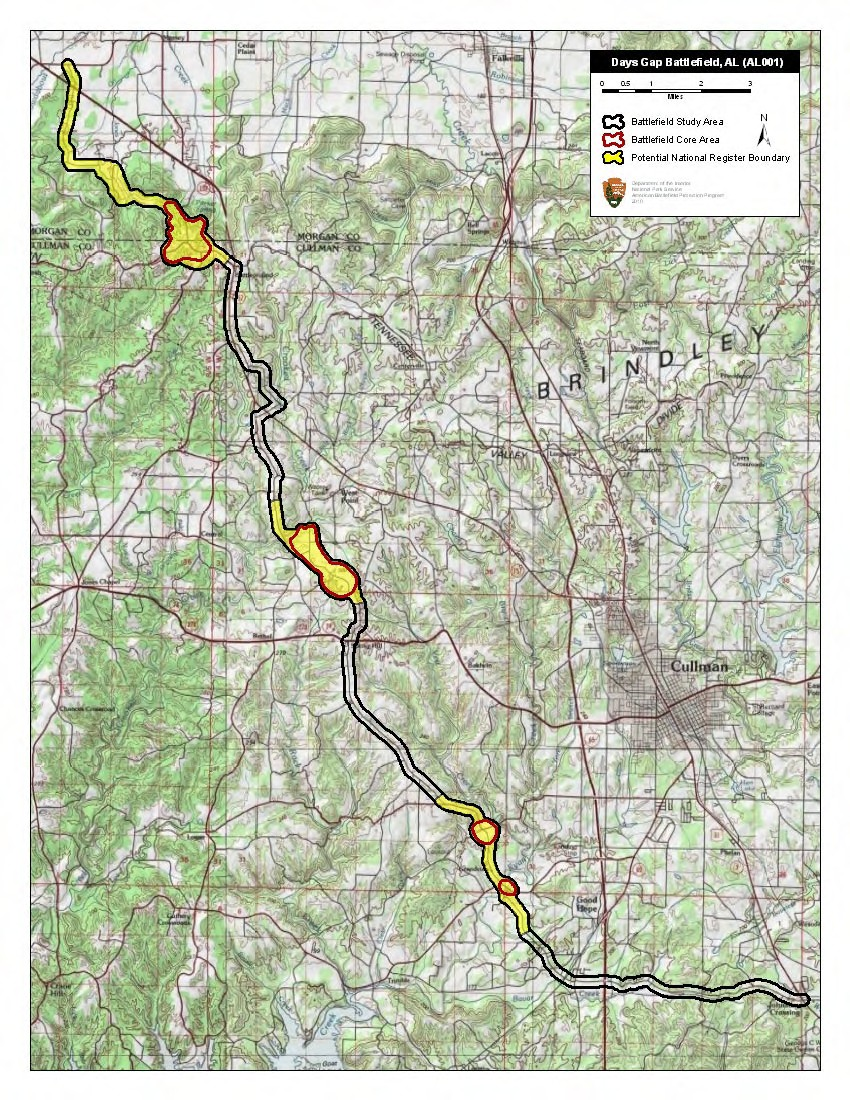
Map of Day's Gap Battlefield core and study areas by the American Battlefield Protection Program.

The Battle of Day's Gap, fought on April 30, 1863, was the first in a series of American Civil War skirmishes in Cullman County, Alabama, that lasted until May 2, known as Streight's Raid. Commanding the Union forces was Col. Abel Streight; Brig. Gen. Nathan Bedford Forrest led the Confederate forces.

== Background ==
The goal of Streight's raid was to cut off the Western & Atlantic Railroad, which supplied General Braxton Bragg's Confederate army in Middle Tennessee. Starting in Nashville, Tennessee, Streight and his men first traveled to Eastport, Mississippi, and then eastward to Tuscumbia, Alabama. On April 26, 1863, Streight left Tuscumbia and marched southeastward. Streight's initial movements were screened by Union Brig. Gen. Grenville Dodge's troops.

== Battle ==
On April 30 at Day's Gap on Sand Mountain, Forrest caught up with Streight's expedition and attacked his rear guard. Streight's men in the rolling hills awaited in force behind each rise. Forrest demanded that Gould should bring the artillery up. Streight's men then surprise attacked from a hidden position of a rise in the hill. Gould's men were outnumbered and forced to leave their artillery pieces. Streight's men bought the time they needed attacking and as a result they continued their march to avoid any further delays and envelopments caused by the Confederate troops.

== Aftermath ==
This battle set off a chain of skirmishes and engagements at Crooked Creek (April 30), Hog Mountain (April 30), Blountsville (May 1), Black Creek/Gadsden (May 2), and Blount's Plantation (May 2). Finally, on May 3, Forrest surrounded Streight's exhausted men 3 mi east of Cedar Bluff, Alabama, and forced their surrender. They were sent to Libby Prison in Richmond, Virginia. Streight and some of his men escaped on February 9, 1864.

The battle also led indirectly to the death of Confederate Lieutenant A. Wills Gould, as an artillery officer who was known for his gallantry in his two years of service. Gould went to Forrest's HQ tent to beg him off of the reassignment but Forrest in his typical manner again started berating him. Forrest witnesses said was cussing him a blue streak. Gould argued in was an impossible task he attempted to perform for Forrest. It immediately became a heated argument. The sequence of event's is unclear as eye witnesses visually could not see the event's unfold. Forrest emerged with a bullet in his abdomen while Gould suffered a stab wound to the lung proving fatal. June 14, 1863, in which Gould was killed. In any event, asking for an artillery officer to limber and unlimber repeatedly in rolling hills was ineffective practice.

== Union order of battle ==
These regiments participated in Streight's raid:

- 80th Illinois Infantry
- 51st Indiana Infantry
- 73rd Indiana Infantry
- 3rd Ohio Infantry
- 1st Middle Tennessee Cavalry (two companies)

== Preservation ==
As of mid-2023, the American Battlefield Trust and its partners have saved 82 acres of the battlefield at Day's Gap. The Trust and its partners have also preserved 40 acres at the battlefield at nearby Hog Mountain, where fighting occurred on the same day.

Historian Fred Wise opened the Crooked Creek Civil War Museum on the land in which the skirmish at Crooked Creek took place. The museum houses numerous relics recovered from the property.

== See also ==
- Report of Col. Abel D. Streight, August 22, 1864.
