= Marion Anderson =

Marion or Marian Anderson may refer to:

- Marion T. Anderson (1839–1904), American soldier and Medal of Honor recipient
- Marian Anderson (1897–1993), American singer
- Marion Anderson (politician) (c. 1914–?), Canadian politician
- Marion Anderson (photographer) (1920–2002), American press photographer
- Marian Anderson (Insaints) (1968–2001), American punk rock singer, lead singer of the Insaints

== See also ==
- Marianne Andersen (born 1980), Norwegian orienteering competitor
