= Fort Fizzle =

Fort Fizzle may refer to:

- The "Battle of Fort Fizzle" in Holmes County, Ohio, in June 1863 in which Federal troops dispersed a group of Civil War draft resisters from a makeshift fort.
- Fort Fizzle (Montana), which was the name given to breastworks and an entrenchment built by federal troops in July 1877 in an unsuccessful attempt to prevent passage on the Lolo Trail of a band of Nez Perce, who simply bypassed the fortification and avoided battle.
