= John G. Mitchell (general) =

United States Army general

John Grant Mitchell
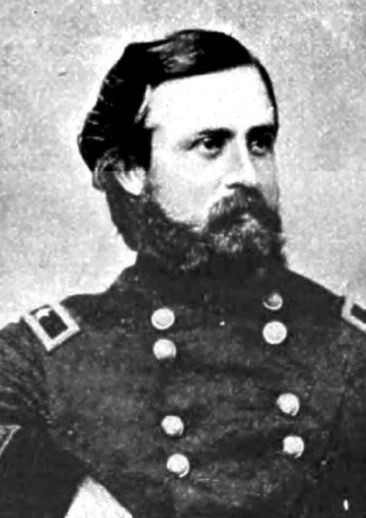
- Brig. Gen. John G. Mitchell
- Born: November 6, 1838; Piqua, Ohio, US
- Died: November 7, 1894 (aged 56); Columbus, Ohio, US
- Alma mater: Kenyon College (BA)
- Relatives: nephew-in-law of Rutherford B. Hayes, father of Grant Mitchell
- Military career
- Allegiance: United States; Union
- Branch: United States Army; Union Army
- Service years: 1861–1865
- Rank: Brigadier general Brevet major general
- Unit: 3rd Ohio Infantry
- Commands: 113th Ohio Infantry; 2nd Brigade, 2nd Division, XIV Corps
- Conflicts: American Civil War: Tullahoma Campaign; Battle of Chickamauga; Battle of Missionary Ridge; Siege of Knoxville; Atlanta campaign; Battle of Nashville; Battle of Averasborough; Battle of Bentonville
- Other work: lawyer, city council president

John Grant Mitchell (November 6, 1838 – November 7, 1894) was an Ohio lawyer and a general in the Union Army during the American Civil War. He was active in several important campaigns and battles in the Western Theater, including the Chickamauga, Atlanta, and Franklin-Nashville and Carolinas campaigns. He commanded a brigade of veteran infantry in many of these operations.

== Early life and career ==
Mitchell was born in Piqua, Ohio. He was educated in the common schools and then attended Kenyon College in Gambier, Ohio, as a young man. He graduated in 1859 and subsequently studied law in Columbus, Ohio, with the firm Swan, Andrews, and Noble.

== Civil War ==
Shortly after the outbreak of the Civil War in early 1861, Mitchell enlisted as a private in the first battalion of the Ohio Reserves. On July 27, he was appointed as the first lieutenant and adjutant of the 3rd Ohio Infantry regiment. On December 21, after reenlisting for three-years, he was advanced to captain and took command of his company. He participated in Ormsby M. Mitchel's campaign in Tennessee and Alabama.

In the autumn of 1862, Mitchell helped raise and recruit what became the 113th Ohio Infantry and was appointed as the regiment's lieutenant colonel on September 2. On May 6, 1863, Mitchell continued his progression through the ranks, being elevated to colonel and leading his regiment during the Tullahoma Campaign. In September of that year, Mitchell took command of the 2nd Brigade, 3rd Division of the Reserve Corps of the Army of the Cumberland. The following month, he became part of the XIV Corps, with which he was associated with for much of the rest of the war.

During the Battle of Chickamauga, Mitchell led a brigade under James B. Steedman which arrived late on the second day and played a leading role in aiding George H. Thomas in holding onto his delaying position atop Horseshoe Ridge. At the Battle of Missionary Ridge near Chattanooga, Tennessee, Mitchell supported Maj. Gen. William T. Sherman's assault column. Later he moved to Ambrose Burnside's relief during the Siege of Knoxville. During the 1864 Atlanta campaign, Mitchell led the advance on the enemy positions in the Battle of Rocky Face Ridge. His regiment suffered severely at the Battle of Resaca and played a prominent role in the battles of Dallas and New Hope Church. His old 113th lost over a hundred men in the assault on Kennesaw Mountain. Mitchell reported to Thomas and took command of the detached XIV Corps during the Battle of Nashville and the subsequent pursuit of the retreating Confederate army of John Bell Hood.

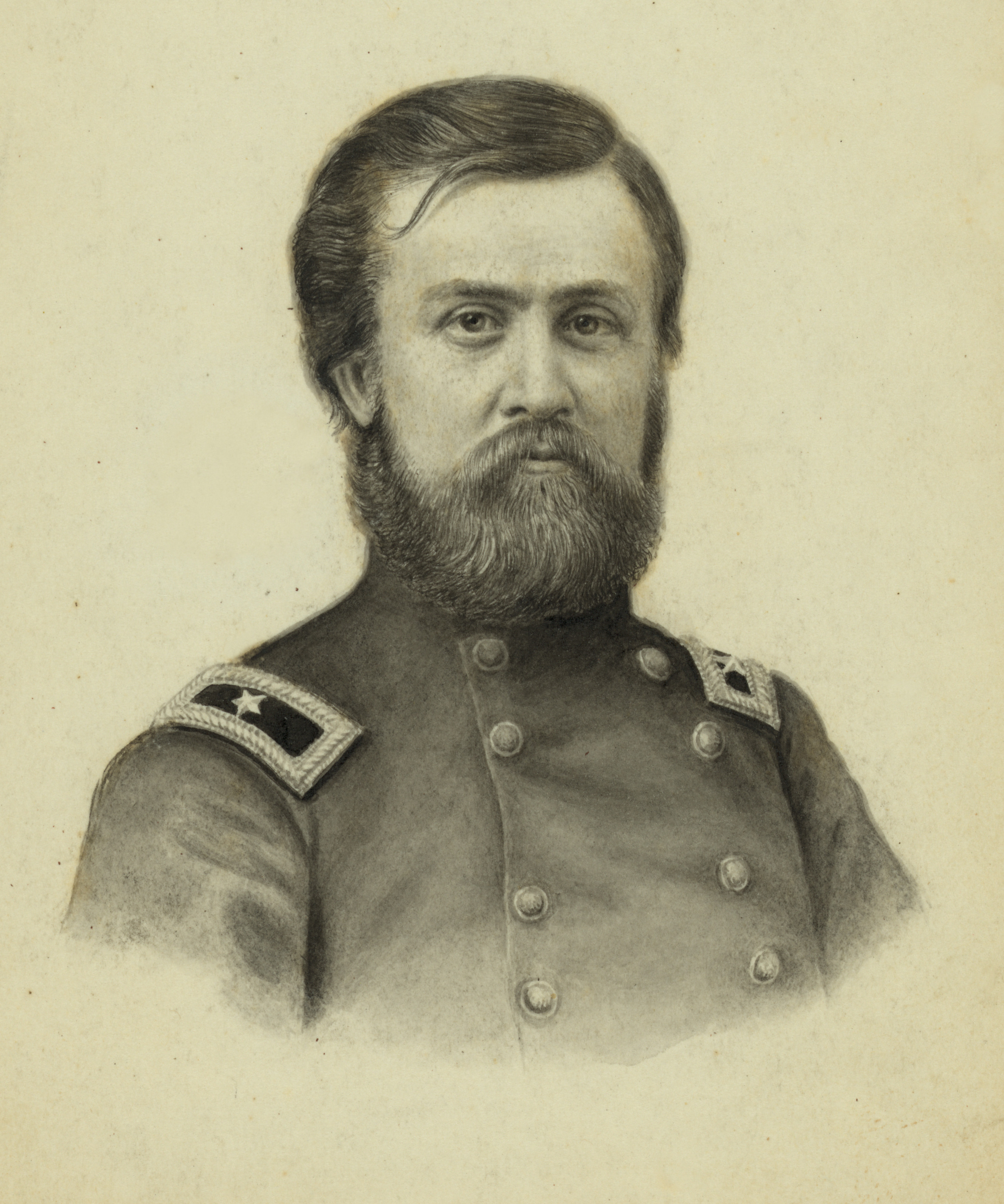
Portrait of John G. Mitchell by Alden Finney Brooks.

On January 12, 1865, on the recommendation of General Sherman, the 26-year-old Mitchell was promoted to brigadier general of volunteers, becoming one of the youngest civilian-soldiers to attain that rank without benefit of preparative military training. He participated in one of the war's final major campaigns, the Carolinas campaign, in the late winter and early spring of 1865. He commanded his brigade at the battles of Averasborough and Bentonville, where his actions halted a major Confederate advance. He was present during the surrender of Confederate General Joseph E. Johnston at Bennett Place in April.

Mitchell then led his men in the Grand Review of the Armies through the streets of Washington, D.C. in early May. In the omnibus promotions following the war, Mitchell received a brevet promotion to major general of volunteers backdated to March 13.

== Postbellum career ==
Mitchell resigned from the Army on July 3, 1865, and returned home to Columbus, Ohio, to resume his legal career. In October 1862, he married Laura Platt, the daughter of Fanny Hayes Platt and niece of fellow Civil War general (and future Ohio Governor and U.S. President) Rutherford B. Hayes. The couple eventually would have four children—three girls and a boy. Mitchell and Hayes remained good friends for the rest of their lives. Mitchell served as the Register in Bankruptcy, President of the Columbus City Council, and as the Ohio pension commissioner.

John G. Mitchell died in Columbus on the day after his 56th birthday. His personal and military papers are archived in the collection of the library of the Rutherford B. Hayes Presidential Center.

His only son, Grant Mitchell, became a leading character actor in Hollywood, California, in the early 20th century.

== See also ==
- List of American Civil War generals (Union)
