= Erastus Newton Bates =

American politician and general

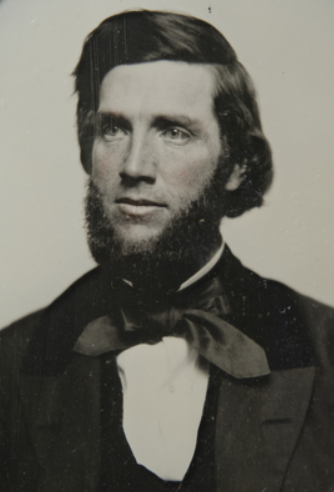
- Erastus Newton Bates c. 1858
- Born: February 29, 1828; Plainfield, Massachusetts
- Died: May 29, 1898 (aged 70); Minneapolis, Minnesota
- Burial place: Oak Ridge Cemetery; Springfield, Illinois
- Military career
- Allegiance: United States of America; Union
- Branch: United States Army; Union Army
- Service years: 1862–1865 (Army)
- Rank: Brevet Brigadier General
- Unit: 80th Illinois Volunteer Infantry Regiment
- Conflicts: American Civil War; Streight's Raid
- Other work: Illinois House of Representatives (1857–1859); Illinois Treasurer (1869–1873)

Erastus Newton Bates (February 29, 1828 – May 29, 1898) was an American politician and general from Massachusetts. A graduate of Williams College, Bates was an early settler of Minnesota and participated in its first constitutional convention and state senate. He then moved to Illinois, where he served with the Union Army in the Civil War. A longtime prisoner of war, Bates was commissioned a brevet brigadier general. Upon his return from the war, he served in the Illinois House of Representatives and as Illinois Treasurer.

== Biography ==
Erastus Newton Bates was born in Plainfield, Massachusetts, on February 29, 1828. When he was eight, his family moved to Ohio. After his father died, Bates lived with an uncle, teaching and working to raise money for college. He was accepted to Williams College in Massachusetts, where he graduated in 1853. He first studied law in New York City, New York, but soon moved to Minnesota, where he practiced law in Minneapolis. There, he was a member of the Minnesota Constitutional Convention of 1856. He was elected as a Republican to the first session of the Minnesota Senate the next year.

Bates moved to Centralia, Illinois in 1859. Three years later, he opened a law office there. He then was commissioned a major of the 80th Illinois Volunteer Infantry Regiment during the Civil War. He was later promoted to lieutenant colonel before he was captured by the Confederates. He was held prisoner of war in Libby Prison for fifteen months. He escaped, but was then immediately recaptured and transferred to Morris Island. After his release, he accepted a full colonelcy and a brevet as brigadier general.

When he returned to Centralia, he was elected to the Illinois House of Representatives, serving one two-year term. This was followed by his election as Illinois Treasurer, serving two two-year terms. He married Lucy A. Sanders in 1855. Bates died in Minneapolis, Minnesota on May 29, 1898. He was buried in Oak Ridge Cemetery in Springfield, Illinois.

Party political offices
Preceded by George W. Smith	Republican nominee for Illinois Treasurer; 1868, 1870	Succeeded by Edward Rutz
Political offices
Preceded by George W. Smith	Treasurer of Illinois; 1869–1873	Succeeded by Edward Rutz
