= Abel Streight =

American politician and soldier

Abel Delos Streight
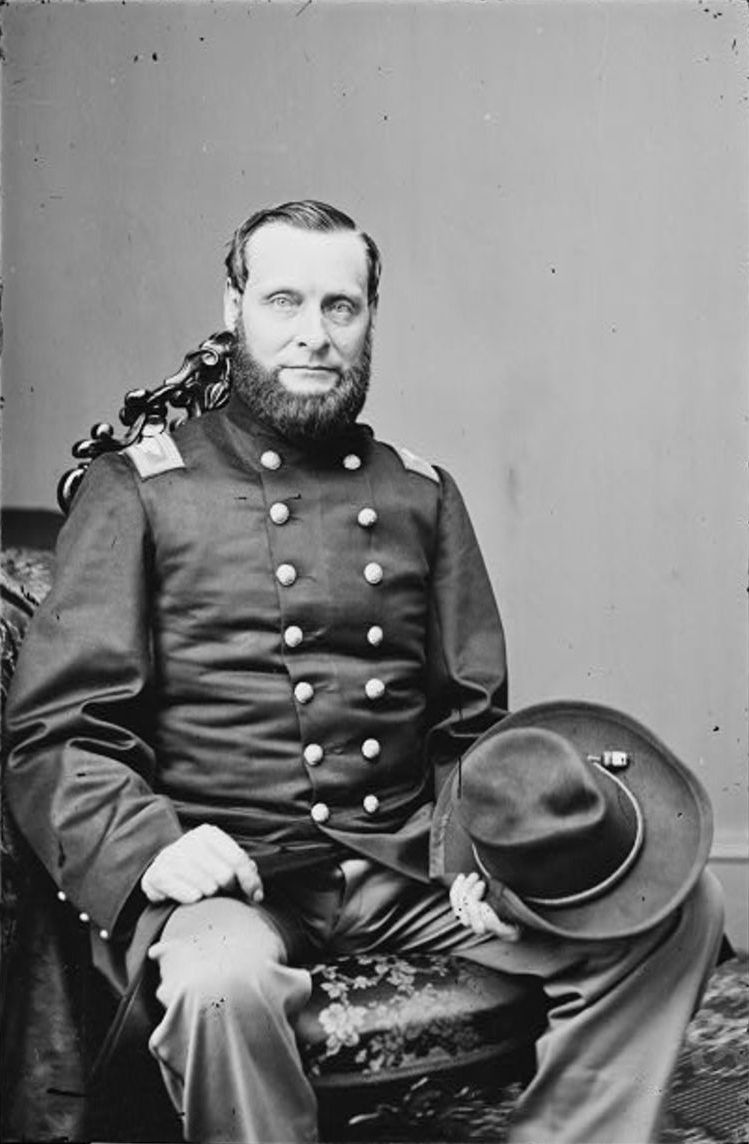
- Col. Abel D. Streight, U.S.A. (1828–1892)
- Born: June 17, 1828; Wheeler, New York, US
- Died: May 27, 1892 (aged 63); Indianapolis, Indiana, US
- Burial place: Crown Hill Cemetery and Arboretum, Section29, Niche Lot 72; 39.816673°N 86.1720462°W
- Military career
- Allegiance: United States of America; Union
- Branch: United States Army; Union Army
- Service years: 1861–1865
- Rank: Colonel; Brevet Brigadier General
- Commands: 51st Indiana Infantry Regiment; Horn Brigade
- Conflicts: American Civil War (1861-1865)

Abel Delos Streight (June 17, 1828 – May 27, 1892) was a peacetime lumber merchant and publisher, and was commissioned a United States Army / Union Army colonel in the American Civil War (1861–1865). His command precipitated a notable cavalry raid in April–May 1863, known as Streight's Raid into northern Alabama. He surrendered in Alabama in 1863 and was a prisoner of war for 10 months in the Confederate States capital of Richmond, Virginia. On March 12, 1866, his nomination for appointment to the grade of brevet brigadier general, to rank dating from March 13, 1865, was confirmed. He later became a politician, and served as a state senator in the Indiana Senate (upper chamber of the Indiana General Assembly - state legislature) back home in the state capital of Indianapolis, Indiana for two terms.

== Early life and Civil War ==
Abel Delos Streight was born in Wheeler, New York (Steuben County), son of Asa Streight and Lydia Spaulding Streight. On January 14, 1849, he married Lavina or Lovina McCarty, who was born 1830, Bath Township, Steuben County, New York and died June 5, 1910, Marion Co., Indiana. He moved west to Cincinnati, Ohio, port city on the north bank of the Ohio River as a young man, and by 1859 was living further west in Indianapolis, the state capital of Indiana, where he became a publisher of books and maps.

Streight was enlisted in the Federal cause at the outbreak of the American Civil War and was appointed colonel of the 51st Indiana Infantry regiment on December 12, 1861, and commissioned into the United States Army / Union Army. His Indiana regiment was soon attached to the Federal Army of the Cumberland.

Streight and his regiment saw very limited action during the first two years of their service as the war progressed further south which is said to have disappointed him greatly.

In 1863, he proposed a plan to his superior Brigadier General James A. Garfield (then chief of staff of the Army of the Cumberland, and future 20th President of the United States, March 1881, and shot in July, dying two months later in 1881) that he be allowed to raise a force to make a raid deeply into the South. His proposal was to disrupt the Western & Atlantic Railroad from Chattanooga in the northeast to Atlanta further southwest, a crucial southeastern Confederacy rail transport hub and manufacturing town, which carried supplies to the Confederate Army of Tennessee further northwest. The Union Army's regional commander, General William S. Rosecrans, gave him permission.

Union forces assigned were from Colonel Streight's own 51st Indiana, 73rd Indiana Infantry, 80th Illinois Infantry, and 3rd Ohio Infantry regiments were placed under Streight's command. This force encompassed approximately 1,700 troops. The original intent was to have this force mounted suitably for fast travel and attacks, living off the land for supplies and rations; however, due largely to wartime shortages, Streight's brigade were equipped with mules instead of swifter horses. This obvious disadvantage, combined with Streight's own military inexperience, was to eventually prove disastrous.

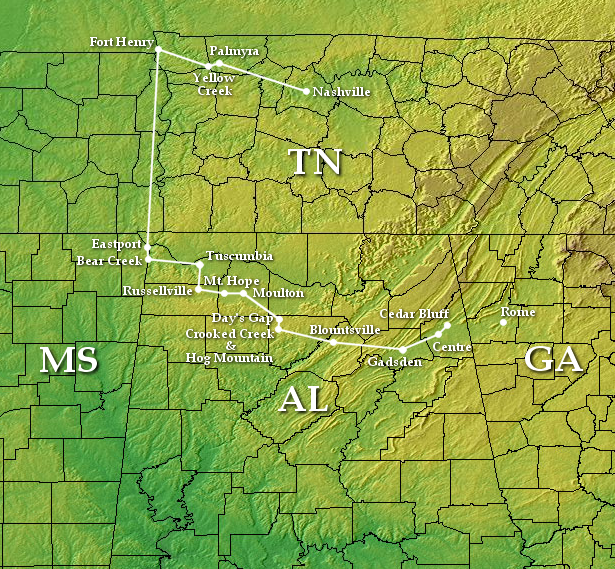
Route of Streight's Raid in 1863

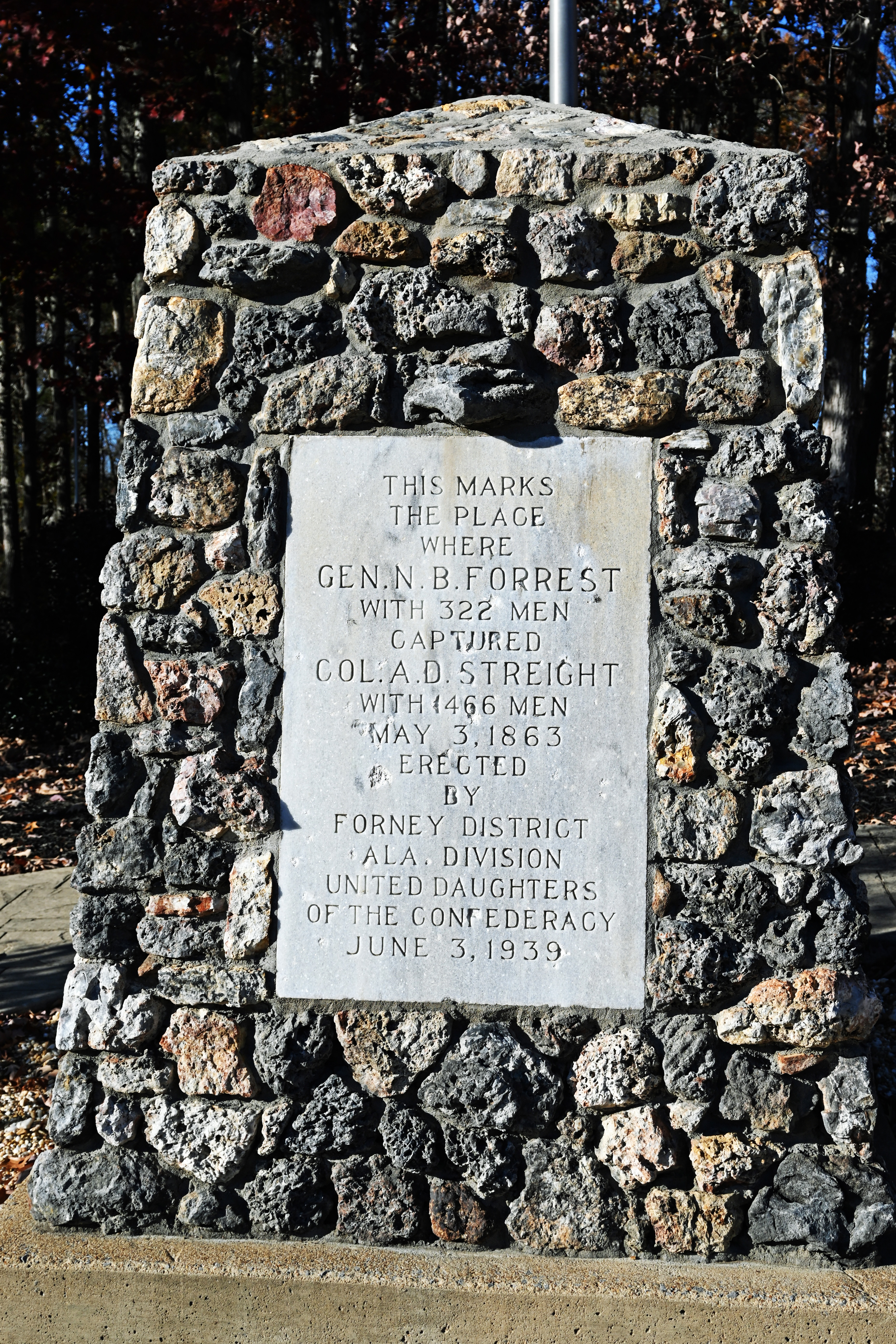
Capture site of Col. Abel Streight in Alabama, 1863

Streight led this force to Nashville, departed Tuscumbia, Alabama, on April 26, 1863, and then to Eastport, Mississippi. From there he decided to push to the southeast, initially screened by another Union force commanded by Brigadier General Grenville Dodge. On April 30, Streight's brigade arrived at Sand Mountain, where he was intercepted by a Confederate cavalry force under notable Brigadier General Nathan Bedford Forrest and harassed for several days. Streight's force won the Battle of Day's Gap but the battle set off a series of skirmishes that eventually led to the Union forces being captured due to a ruse by the much smaller Confederate force. Streight himself was captured along with his entire command at Cedar Bluff, Alabama on May 3, 1863, and taken east to the infamous Libby Prison as a prisoner of war in the Confederate States capital in Richmond, Virginia for the next ten months.

Lovina McCarthy Streight and the couple's five-year-old son accompanied the 51st Indiana Regiment into the South with Lovina acting as a nurse for the unit. The soldiers dubbed her "The Mother of the 51st" for her contributions. Lovina was captured herself three times by Confederate soldiers. Twice she was exchanged in return for Southern prisoners of war. The third time she brazenly escaped using a gun she had hidden under her skirts.

On February 9, 1864, after ten months of incarceration and 14 months before the end of the war, Colonel Streight and 107 other soldiers escaped from the horrible devastating conditions at the Libby Prison in downtown Richmond by tunnelling from their barracks to freedom. Eventually, Streight was able to sneak through Confederate Virginia and cross through enemy territory and, on his return, gave a debriefing report to his Union commanders.

Eventually Streight was restored to active duty being placed in command of the 1st Brigade, 3rd Division, IV Corps. He returned to the Western Theater, participating in the later battles of Franklin and Nashville in Tennessee. Thirteen months after his escape, Streight resigned from the Federal army on March 16, 1865, three weeks before Confederate General Robert E. Lee's surrender at Appomattox Courthouse in April 1865.

Nine months after Lee's surrender and the virtual end of the war, on January 13, 1866, new 17th President Andrew Johnson (1808–1875, served 1865–1869) nominated Streight for appointment to the grade of brevet brigadier general of volunteers, to rank backdated from March 13, 1865, and the United States Senate confirmed the appointment two months later on March 12, 1866.

== Civilian career ==
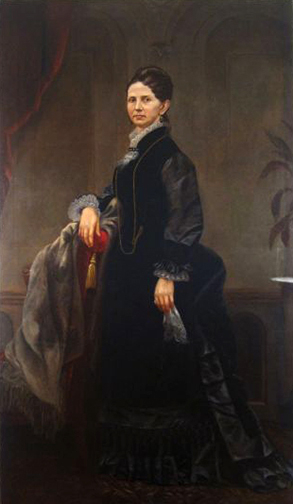
Portrait of Lovina McCarthy Streight by Julia Cox (1880)

The year after the war, after returning home to "The Hoosier State", in 1866, Streight and his wife built a large landmark Greek Revival / Classical Revival style architecture with tall white columns and portico (reminiscent of old-style Southern antebellum plantation manor houses) of a two-story brick mansion on a wooded 23-acre estate in the then rural / country at 4121 East Washington Street. The old luxurious estate facing on the historic east–west National Road (from Baltimore, Maryland to Vandalia, Illinois near the Mississippi River, (later in the 1920s designated as U.S. Route 40), just east of Indianapolis. A decade later, in the American Centennial year of 1876, Streight ran successfully for a seat as a state senator in the Indiana Senate, (the upper chamber of the state legislature Indiana General Assembly, sitting in the Indiana Statehouse (state capitol), serving a two-year term. Another decade later in 1880, he ran unsuccessfully as the dominant Republican Party candidate for Governor of Indiana. In 1888, he was once again elected as a State Senator. He died in Indianapolis four years later, in May 1892, from complications of Bright's Disease. Although initially buried on the front lawn of his residence at his widow's request, his grave was eventually moved ten years later in 1902 to the nearby prominent Crown Hill Cemetery. The impressive grave site includes a bronze head bust of the merchant, publisher, colonel, prisoner-of-war, and later general, followed by state senator, The sculpture is inserted into and surrounded / surmounted by a huge monumental granite temple-like structure with places beneath for Streight, his wife Lovina and their oldest son John. Special collections of his and his wife Lovina's papers and memorabilia are held at the Indiana Historical Society in Indianapolis.

Streight was also the author of The Crisis of Eighteen Hundred and Sixty-one in the Government of the United States, published in 1861 at the outbreak of the conflict then tearing at the nation.

Streight's wife Lovina joined her husband on his southern campaign during the war, often ministering as a nurse to help the wounded men during and after battles. She was captured three times and exchanged for prisoners. When Abel died in 1892 she had him buried in the front yard of their home, stating, "I never knew where he was in life, but now I can find him." Lovina Streight was known as the "Mother of the 51st", and upon her death 45 years after the war in 1910, her funeral too like his in 1892 was afforded full military honors and attended by a large concourse of veterans and Indiana citizens. It was said at the time that her funeral drew the largest crowd of mourners to Crown Hill Cemetery in Indianapolis since the earlier turn-of-the-century funeral of fellow Indianan. and 23rd President Benjamin Harrison (1833–1901, served 1889–1893). In her probated will, she directed that the large elaborate Streight family mansion on Washington Street should become a home for aged women; however, other relatives successfully challenged the will in orphans court on the grounds that she was of “unsound mind.” Their main arguments used by the plaintiffs were that she believed in spiritualism and was under the influence of B. Frank Schmid, a spiritualist. The controversial trial, held in nearby Shelbyville, Indiana, over Lavina's will was a big news story in its day, and was covered in the several local daily newspapers of the time.

== See also ==
- List of American Civil War brevet generals (Union)
