= Representative Rodgers =

Representative Rodgers may refer to:

- Cathy McMorris Rodgers (1969-), United States Representative (2005-)
- Norman Rodgers, (1927-), Iowa state Representative (1969–1973)
- Andrew Rodgers (1827–1922), Illinois state Representative
- Robert L. Rodgers (1875–1960), United States Representative (1939–1947)
