= Andrew Rodgers =

American politician (1827–1922)

Andrew F. Rodgers
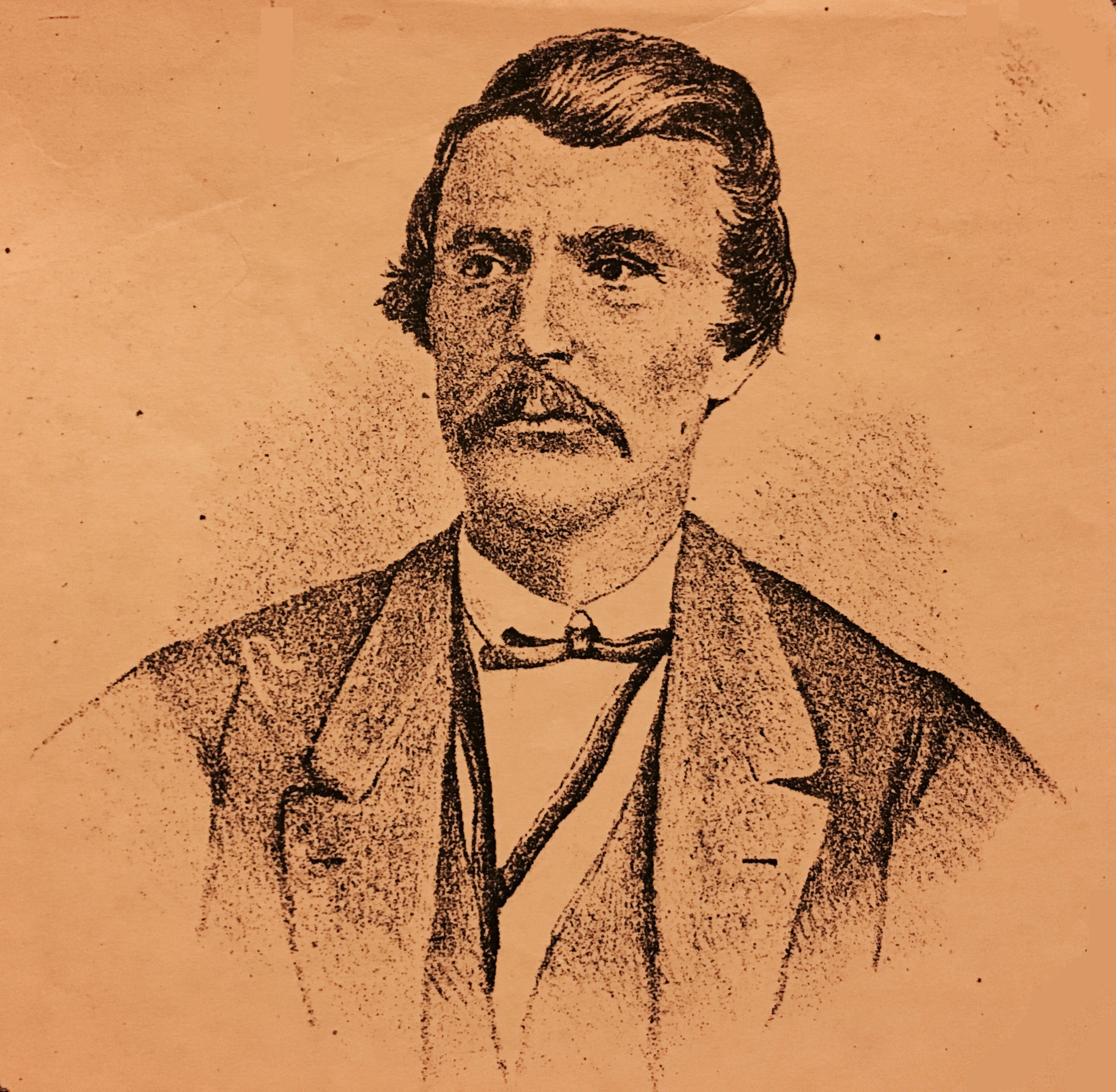
- Born: October 13, 1827; Howard County, Missouri
- Died: January 20, 1922 (aged 94); Alton, Illinois
- Burial place: Oakwood Cemetery, Alton, Illinois
- Military career
- Allegiance: United States of America; Union
- Branch: United States Army; Union Army
- Service years: 1846–1864 (Army)
- Rank: Colonel
- Unit: 80th Illinois Volunteer Infantry Regiment
- Conflicts: Mexican–American War: Battle of Buena Vista; American Civil War: Battle of Perryville; Streight's Raid
- Other work: Illinois House of Representatives

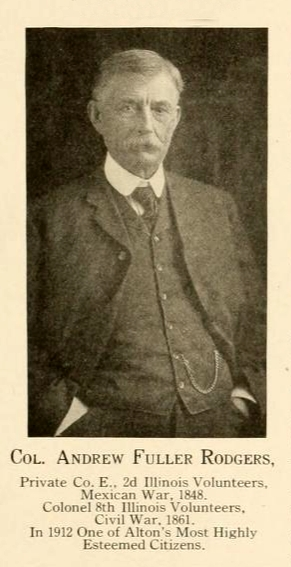
Andrew Rodgers, c1912

Andrew Fuller Rodgers (13 October 1827 – 20 January 1922) was a colonel in the American Civil War and member of the Illinois House of Representatives.

== Early life and career ==
Rodgers was born on 13 October 1827 in Howard County, Missouri, to Ebenezer Rodgers and Purinelia Jackson Rodgers. Ebenezer was a native of Wales and emigrated to America in 1818. He settled in the Boonslick region of Missouri and worked as a teacher. In 1833 he moved to Upper Alton, Illinois, where he served as a preacher and helped get Shurtleff College off the ground and running. Purinelia was the daughter of Capt. John Jackson, a veteran of the War of 1812.

Andrew Rodgers was educated at Shurtleff College. In 1844, at the age of seventeen, he clerked at a hardware store and pursued a business life until the outbreak of the Mexican-American War in 1846.

In 1846, Rodgers volunteered to fight in the Mexican–American War and joined Company E of the Second Illinois Regiment under the leadership of Col. William Henry Bissell. Their unit saw substantial action at the Battle of Buena Vista.

Afterward Rodgers set out to California in 1849 along with thousands of others in the California Gold Rush. In 1851 he was appointed deputy sheriff of Sacramento by Benjamin McCulloch and then later served a second term while still mining. At the death of his father in 1853, Rodgers returned home to Illinois and farmed.

== American Civil War ==
In 1862, Rodgers volunteered to fight in the American Civil War, joined the 80th Illinois Volunteer Infantry Regiment, and was chosen its lieutenant colonel. As part of the 80th Illinois, Rodgers saw substantial action at the Battle of Perryville in the fall of 1862, where he was effectively the regimental commander due to Col. Thomas Allen's absence at the battle scene. With Allen's resignation in April 1863, Rodgers took command as colonel.

The unit was an integral part of Streight's Raid in northern Alabama. Due largely to poor supplies and poor planning it ended with the defeat and capture of the men at Cedar Bluff, Alabama, by Confederate General Nathan Bedford Forrest. As a captured officer, Rodgers was sent to Libby Prison in Richmond, Virginia, and spent a year there where he was forced to endure its many horrors, including disease, tight confinement, and malnutrition. Later he was moved to Macon, Georgia, and then to Charleston along with about fifty other officers where he was used by the rebels as a hostage to prevent Union fire on the city.

In July 1864 Rodgers was exchanged and returned home. Gen. William Rosecrans persuaded Rodgers to recruit and organize the 144th Illinois Volunteer Infantry Regiment. Rodgers ultimately organized approximately 800 men in the 144th and Gov. Richard Yates offered Rodgers the colonelcy of the unit, but he turned down the offer and opted for discharge from the Army. Some sources suggest Rodgers was upset he was not offered command of his old unit, the 80th Illinois, but later in life Rodgers suggested he was simply tired and worn out from fighting and his time in prison.

== Life after the war ==
After his discharge from the Army, Rodgers returned home to Illinois and focused on farming and his growing family, which eventually included two sons and two daughters. Rodgers was nominated as the Democratic Party's nominee for Madison County Clerk in 1865, but lost. In 1870 he was nominated as the Democratic candidate for the Illinois House of Representatives and won. In 1896 he was Mayor of Upper Alton, which has since been incorporated in the larger city of Alton. Rodgers died on 20 January 1922 at the age of ninety-four.
