= 144th Regiment =

144th Regiment may refer to:

- 144th (Surrey and Sussex Yeomanry) Field Regiment, Royal Artillery
- 144th (Surrey & Sussex Yeomanry Queen Mary’s) Field Regiment, Royal Artillery
- 144th Infantry Regiment (Imperial Japanese Army)
- 144th Infantry Regiment (United States)
- 144th Regiment Royal Armoured Corps

== American Civil War regiments ==
- 144th Illinois Infantry Regiment
- 144th Indiana Infantry Regiment
- 144th New York Infantry Regiment
- 144th Ohio Infantry Regiment
