= John Beatty (Ohio politician) =

American banker and politician

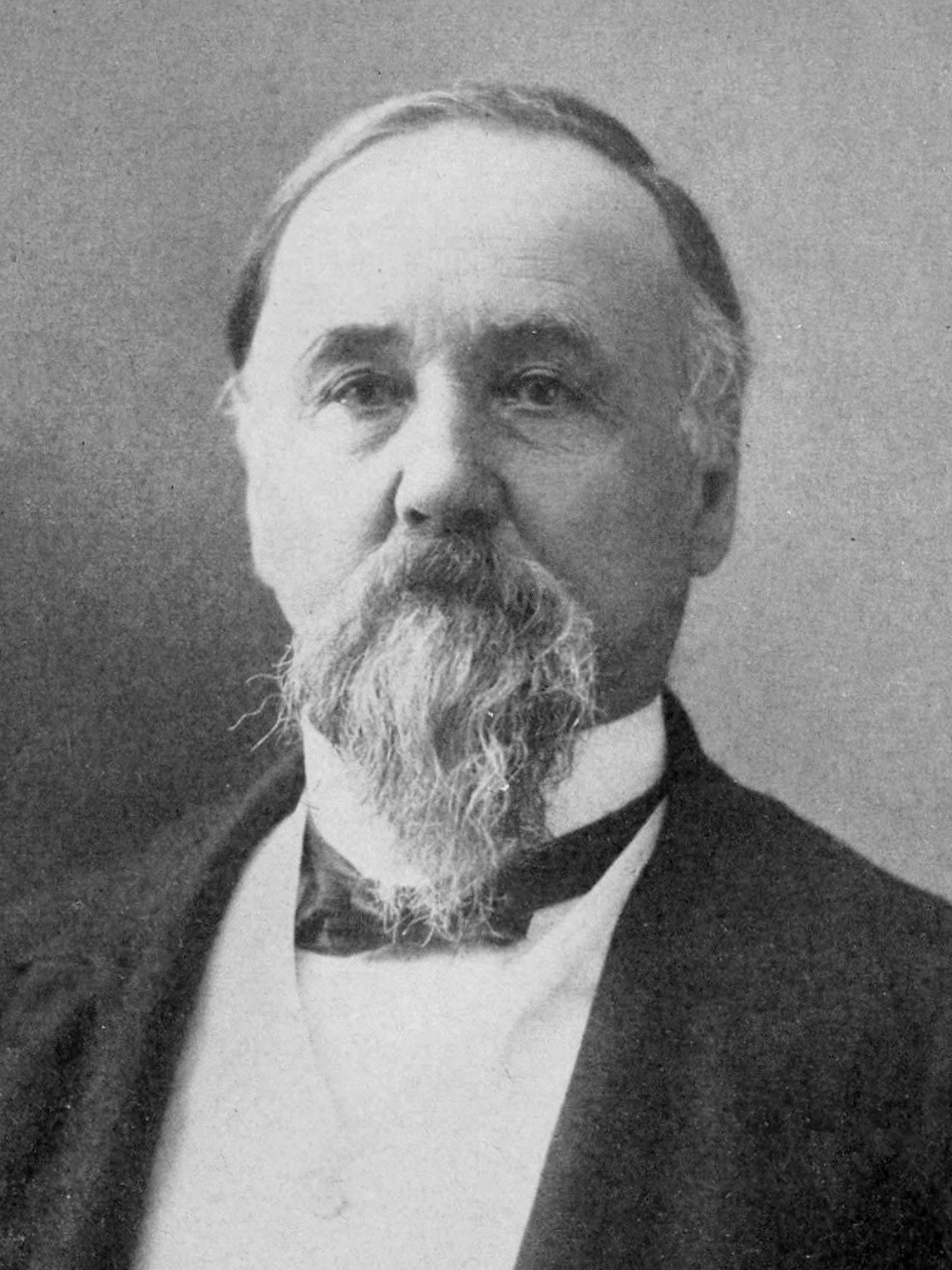

Member of the U.S. House of Representatives from Ohio's 8th district
- In office February 5, 1868 – March 3, 1873
- Preceded by: Cornelius S. Hamilton
- Succeeded by: William Lawrence

Personal details
- Born: December 16, 1828 Sandusky, Ohio
- Died: December 21, 1914 (aged 86) Columbus, Ohio
- Resting place: Oakland Cemetery, Sandusky, Ohio
- Party: Republican
- Profession: Politician, banker

Military service
- Allegiance: United States of America
- Branch/service: United States Army; Union Army
- Years of service: 1861-1864
- Rank: Brigadier General
- Unit: 3rd Ohio Infantry

John Beatty (December 16, 1828 – December 21, 1914) was an American banker and statesman from Sandusky, Ohio. He served as a brigadier general in the Union Army during the American Civil War.

== Biography ==
Beatty was born near Sandusky, Ohio. He entered the banking business in Morrow County. Presidential elector for Lincoln/Hamlin in 1860 and in 1884.

=== Civil War ===
When the Civil War started, Beatty volunteered as a private in the 3rd Ohio Infantry, serving in western Virginia. By 1863, he was commissioned as a brigadier general following his distinguished service in the Battle of Perryville, the Battle of Stones River, and the Tullahoma Campaign. He took command of a brigade of infantry and led it through the rest of the war. Beatty participated in the Tullahoma Campaign, the Battle of Chickamauga, and the successful Union attack on Missionary Ridge during the Chattanooga Campaign. He resigned his commission in January 1864 and re-entered the banking business.

=== Congress ===
Following the war, he represented Ohio in the U.S. Congress from 1868 to 1873.

=== Later career ===
He served as a presidential elector in 1884 for the Blaine/Logan ticket.

A 1909 biographer wrote that Beatty was then "the sole survivor of the electoral college of Ohio, which cast its vote for Abraham Lincoln in 1860, and as far as known, the only surviving elector who cast a vote for President Lincoln when he was chosen to his first term almost a half century ago."

Beatty was buried in Oakland Cemetery in Sandusky.

== Autobiography ==
Beatty wrote The citizen-soldier, or, Memoirs of a volunteer, Cincinnati : Wilstach, Baldwin, 1879. The book has been reprinted more than once.

Prior to the Civil War, John Beatty was a banker.
Yet like many others, North & South,
swiftly demonstrated a capacity for war.

— Dave Powell

== See also ==
- List of American Civil War generals (Union)

== Notes ==
Attribution

U.S. House of Representatives
Preceded by Cornelius S. Hamilton	Member of the U.S. House of Representatives from Ohio's 8th congressional district 1868-1873	Succeeded by William Lawrence
