= Glenmont, Ohio =

- Village
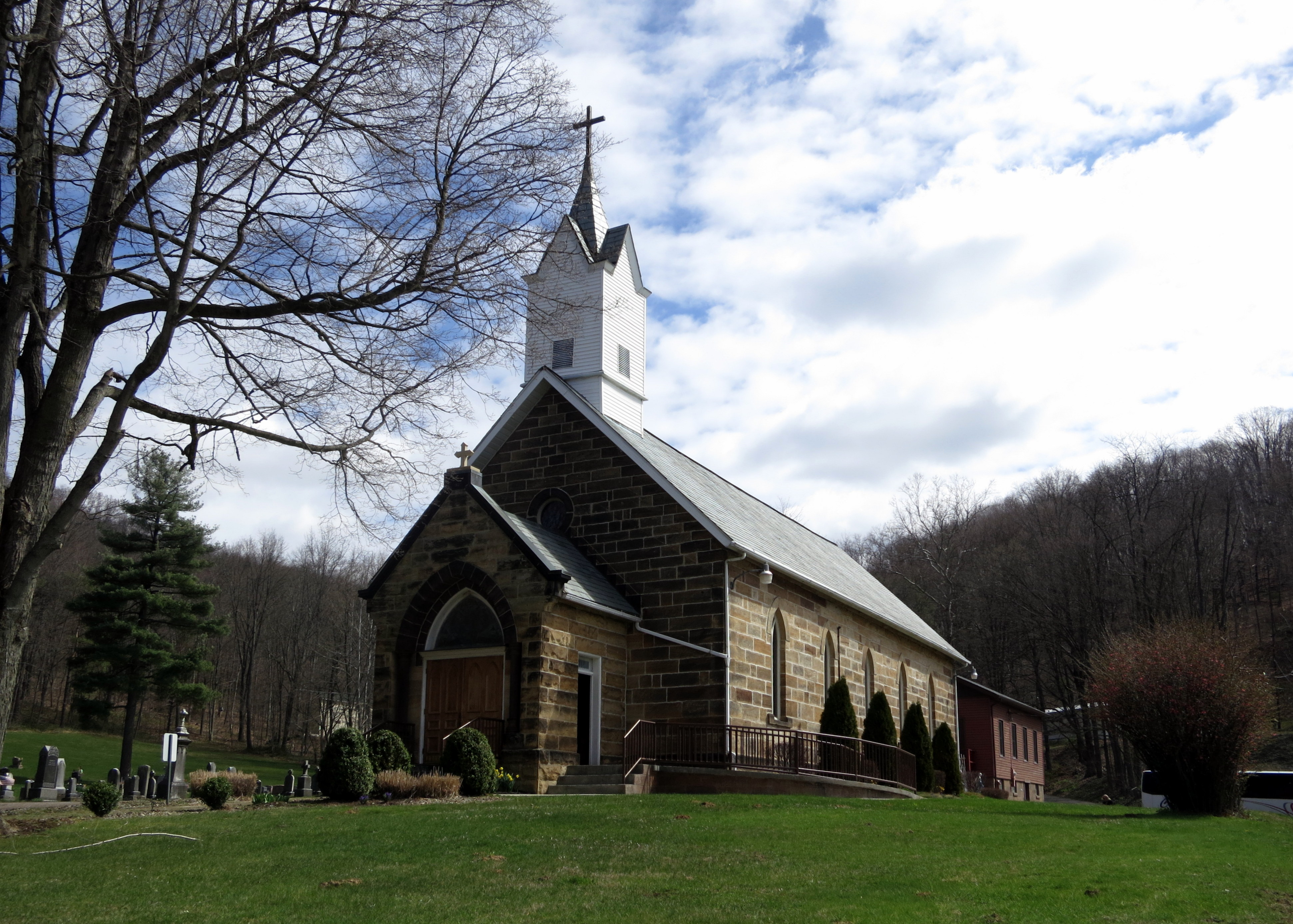
- SS Peter and Paul Church

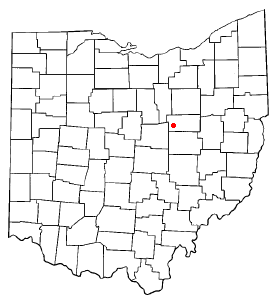
- Location of Glenmont, Ohio

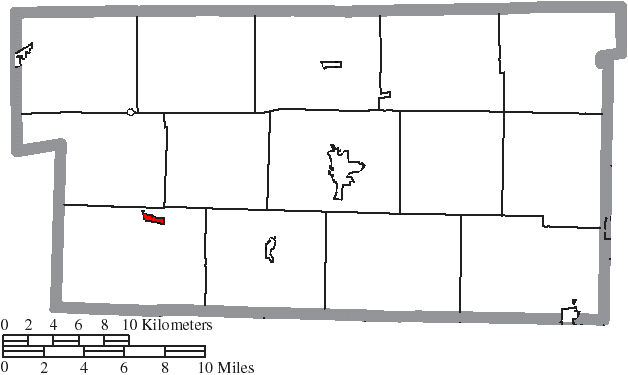
- Location of Glenmont in Holmes County
- Coordinates: 40°31′09″N 82°05′33″W
- Country: United States
- State: Ohio
- County: Holmes
- Township: Richland

Area
  - Total: 0.27 sq mi (0.71 km^{2})
  - Land: 0.27 sq mi (0.71 km^{2})
  - Water: 0 sq mi (0.00 km^{2})
- Elevation: 1,027 ft (313 m)

Population (2020)
  - Total: 240
  - Estimate (2023): 238
  - Density: 872.3/sq mi (336.81/km^{2})
- Time zone: UTC-5 (Eastern (EST))
  - Summer (DST): UTC-4 (EDT)
- ZIP code: 44628
- Area code: 330
- FIPS code: 39-30506
- GNIS feature ID: 2398976

Glenmont is a village in Holmes County, Ohio, United States. The population was 240 at the 2020 census.

== History ==
In 1863, during the American Civil War, a riot by nearly 1,000 draft resisters in Glenmont was subdued by the Union Army in what became known as the Battle of Fort Fizzle.

== Geography ==
According to the United States Census Bureau, the village has a total area of 0.27 square miles (0.70 km^{2}), all land.

== Demographics ==
Historical population
Census	Pop.	Note	%±
1900	209		—
1910	269		28.7%
1920	287		6.7%
1930	279		−2.8%
1940	281		0.7%
1950	242		−13.9%
1960	283		16.9%
1970	266		−6.0%
1980	270		1.5%
1990	233		−13.7%
2000	283		21.5%
2010	272		−3.9%
2020	240		−11.8%
2023 (est.)	238	▼	−0.8%
U.S. Decennial Census

=== 2010 census ===
As of the census of 2010, there were 272 people, 116 households, and 67 families living in the village. The population density was 1,007.4 inhabitants per square mile (389.0/km^{2}). There were 123 housing units at an average density of 455.6 per square mile (175.9/km^{2}). The racial makeup of the village was 98.2% White, 0.4% Native American, 0.7% Asian, 0.4% from other races, and 0.4% from two or more races. Hispanic or Latino of any race were 0.4% of the population.

There were 116 households, of which 29.3% had children under the age of 18 living with them, 41.4% were married couples living together, 10.3% had a female householder with no husband present, 6.0% had a male householder with no wife present, and 42.2% were non-families. 32.8% of all households were made up of individuals, and 14.6% had someone living alone who was 65 years of age or older. The average household size was 2.34 and the average family size was 3.01.

The median age in the village was 37.8 years. 25.7% of residents were under the age of 18; 7% were between the ages of 18 and 24; 24.3% were from 25 to 44; 26.5% were from 45 to 64; and 16.5% were 65 years of age or older. The gender makeup of the village was 50.4% male and 49.6% female.

=== 2000 census ===
As of the census of 2000, there were 283 people, 115 households, and 73 families living in the village. The population density was 1,043.9 inhabitants per square mile (403.1/km^{2}). There were 122 housing units at an average density of 450.0 per square mile (173.7/km^{2}). The racial makeup of the village was 99.29% White, 0.35% Asian, and 0.35% from two or more races. Hispanic or Latino of any race were 0.35% of the population.

There were 115 households, out of which 33.0% had children under the age of 18 living with them, 55.7% were married couples living together, 5.2% had a female householder with no husband present, and 36.5% were non-families. 28.7% of all households were made up of individuals, and 16.5% had someone living alone who was 65 years of age or older. The average household size was 2.46 and the average family size was 3.12.

In the village, the population was spread out, with 26.5% under the age of 18, 7.1% from 18 to 24, 30.4% from 25 to 44, 20.5% from 45 to 64, and 15.5% who were 65 years of age or older. The median age was 36 years. For every 100 females there were 96.5 males. For every 100 females age 18 and over, there were 90.8 males.

The median income for a household in the village was $34,531, and the median income for a family was $43,750. Males had a median income of $30,208 versus $25,156 for females. The per capita income for the village was $17,001. About 4.9% of families and 11.4% of the population were below the poverty line, including 23.3% of those under the age of eighteen and 7.0% of those 65 or over.
