= Emma Sansom =

Alabama farmgirl noted for bravery in the American Civil War

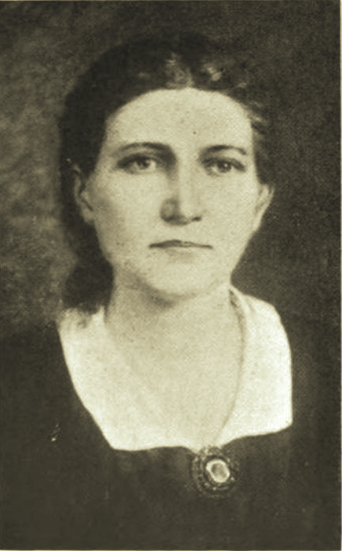
- Born: 2 August 1847 near Social Circle, Georgia, U.S.A.
- Died: 9 August 1900 (aged 53); Upshur County, Texas, U.S.A.

Monument to Emma Sansom

Emma Sansom (June 2, 1847 – August 9, 1900) was an Alabama teenager and farm worker noted for her actions during the American Civil War (1861-1865), during which she assisted the defensive campaign of the mounted cavalry in the Confederate Army's then Brigadier General Nathan Bedford Forrest (1821-1877), during the Streight's Raid by Union Army cavalry under command of Col. Abel Streight in April-May 1863.

Activists 157 years later in the 2020 racial protests, including descendants of Sansom herself, called for the removal of a statue previously erected commemorating her in Gadsden, Alabama.

== Early life ==
Sansom was born on June 2, 1847, further east near Social Circle, Georgia, to Micajah and Levina Vann Sansom, a niece of Cherokee tribe native leader James Vann. Around 1852, she and her family moved west to a farm just outside Gadsden, Alabama. Her father died in 1858, by which time there were twelve children in her family.

== Streight's raid ==
In April 1863, Confederate States Army Brig. Gen. Nathan Bedford Forrest was ordered into northern Alabama to pursue Union Army / United States Army cavalry units under Colonel Abel Streight (1828-1892), who had orders to cut off the Confederate railroad near Chattanooga, Tennessee.

On May 2, 1863, Streight arrived just outside Gadsden and prepared to cross nearby Black Creek. Because the creek was swollen and running high due to recent rains, Streight realized that if he destroyed the bridge he could get a few hours' respite from the pursuit of Forrest's Southerners. Seeing the nearby Sansom farmhouse, he rode upon it and demanded some smoldering burning coals from their fireplace / stove which he could use to burn the Black Creek bridge. When Forrest's men arrived later at the site, they found the burned out bridge and came under fire from Streight's men on the opposite bank.

General Forrest rode to the Sansom house a few hours later and asked whether there was another bridge further up or down across the creek. Emma Sansom, then only 16 years old, told him that the nearest bridge was in Gadsden, two miles away. Forrest then asked if there was a place where he could ford in a shallow spot to get across the creek. Emma told him that if one of his men would help saddle her horse, she would show him a place that she had seen cows cross the creek, and that he might be able to cross there. He replied that there was no time to saddle a horse and asked her to swing and get up on his horse behind him. As they started to leave, Emma's mother objected, but relented when the general assured her that he would bring the girl back safely. Emma then directed Forrest to the spot where she saw cattle wading across where he too could cross the river. Some accounts of the skirmish indicate that the two also came under fire from nearby Union soldiers, who subsequently ceased fire when they realized that they had been firing on a teenage girl. After taking Emma back to her home, Forrest continued his pursuit of Col. Streight, whom he was later able to capture and surrender his invading and larger cavalry detachment near Cedar Bluff the following day.

Sansom's actions are noteworthy in that openly aiding Confederate forces could have subjected her and her family to prosecution (or even death) from the Union Army if they continued to be victorious and occupy the area as the war continued.

== Later life ==
Sansom married Christopher B. Johnson on October 29, 1864, 17 months after the incident with General Forrest, and moved further west to Texas in late 1876 or early 1877. She died August 9, 1900 at the age of 53 in Upshur County, Texas, and is buried in Little Mound Cemetery there.

== Honors ==
Forty-four years later after the celebrated Civil War incident and seven years after her death in Texas, a monument was constructed in 1907 in Gadsden at the western end of the Broad Street bridge across the Coosa River in honor of her actions. When the residents of nearby Alabama City, Alabama (later annexed into Gadsden) built a high school for their town in 1929, they named it in her honor. With the consolidation of the three Gadsden city high schools at the end of the 2006 school year, the General Forrest Middle School was closed and the Emma Sansom High School became reorganized / renamed Emma Sansom Middle School.

== Controversy ==
In 2020, the statue became a place of conflict between Black Lives Matter protestors and counter-protestors during the wave of racial justice protests triggered by the murder of George Floyd by Minneapolis Police Department officers. The Gadsden city council had debated moving the statue to a nearby cemetery where Confederate soldiers were buried, but voted against it.

Preston Rhea, a descendant of Sansom, wrote a letter signed by thirteen other descendants in support of removing the monument. The Southern Poverty Law Center has identified this statue as one of hundreds of statues constructed by the Lost Cause movement to support white supremacy during the Jim Crow era.
