= 80th Illinois Infantry Regiment =

80th Illinois Volunteer Infantry Regiment
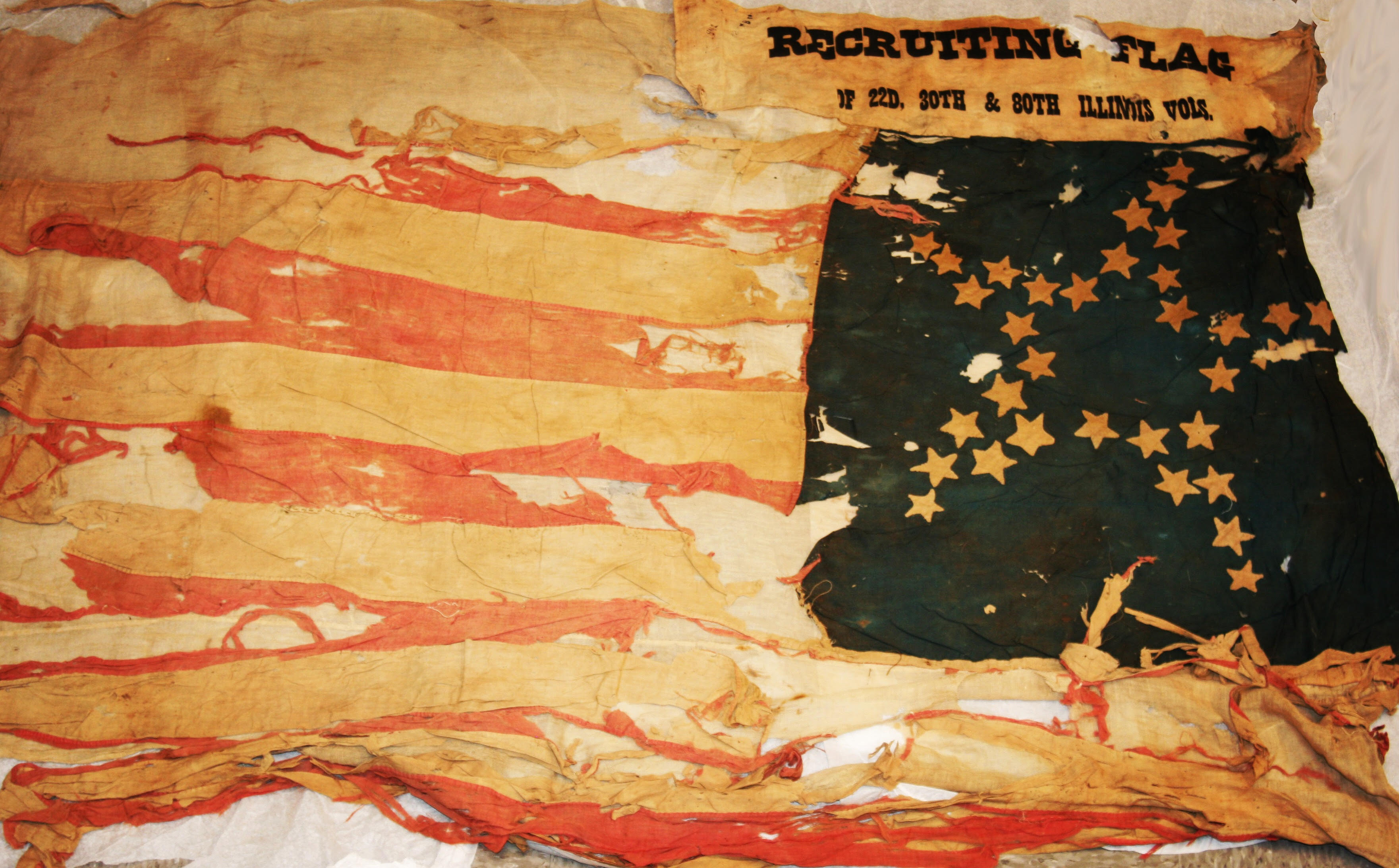
- Recruiting flag
- Active: 25 August 1862 to 10 June 1865
- Country: United States
- Allegiance: (United States) Union
- Branch: Union Army
- Type: Infantry
- Engagements: American Civil War: Battle of Perryville; Streight's Raid; Chattanooga campaign; Atlanta campaign

Commanders
- Initial Colonel: Thomas G. Allen
- Initial Lt. Colonel: Andrew Rodgers
- Initial Major: Erastus Newton Bates

The 80th Illinois Volunteer Infantry Regiment was an infantry regiment that served in the Union Army during the American Civil War. The regiment was composed of ten companies that drew primarily from eight southern Illinois counties. Over the course of the war the regiment traveled approximately 6,000 miles, and was in over 20 battles.

== History ==
=== Organization and early service ===
In the summer of 1862 President Lincoln issued calls for more volunteers in the war effort. In July he requested 300,000 men for three years of service, and the next month, on 4 August 1862, he issued a call for 300,000 more men for nine months of service. In part as a patriotic response to these calls, the 80th Illinois Infantry was organized by Colonel Thomas G. Allen at Centralia, Illinois and mustered into service on 25 August 1862.

Company	Primary County of Recruitment	Earliest Captain
A	Jackson and Randolph	James L. Mann
B	Madison	George W. Carr
C	St. Clair	Henry Zeis
D	Randolph	Carter C. Williams
E	Jefferson	Stephen T. Stratton
F	Randolph	Edmund R. Jones
G	Perry and Randolph	Andrew Wilson
H	Marion and Jefferson	James Cunningham
I	Washington	Daniel Hay
K	Madison	Alexander Hodge

The regiment was ordered to Louisville on 4 September 1862, and assigned to the 33rd Brigade, Tenth Division, of the Union Army of the Ohio. Brigadier General William R. Terrill commanded the brigade, Brigadier General James S. Jackson commanded the division, and Maj. Gen. Alexander M. McCook commanded the I Corps.

=== Battle of Perryville ===
I was in every battle, skirmish and march that was made by the First Tennessee Regiment during the war, and I do not remember of a harder contest and more evenly fought battle than that of Perryville. If it had been two men wrestling, it would have been called a "dog fall." Both sides claim victory—both whipped.

— Private Sam Watkins, 1st Tennessee

In its first principal action of the war the regiment participated in the Battle of Perryville (also known as the Battle of Chaplin Hills) and suffered extensive casualties. The group set out from Louisville on 1 October 1862 under the direction of Maj. Gen. Don Carlos Buell and marched in pursuit of Confederate Gen. Braxton Bragg, passing through Taylorville, Bloomfield and Mackville before engaging in the Battle of Perryville on 8 October 1862. The 80th Illinois fell under the command of Brig. Gen. William R. Terrill (33rd Brigade) and Brig. Gen. James S. Jackson (10th Division). Both Terrill and Jackson were ultimately killed in the battle.

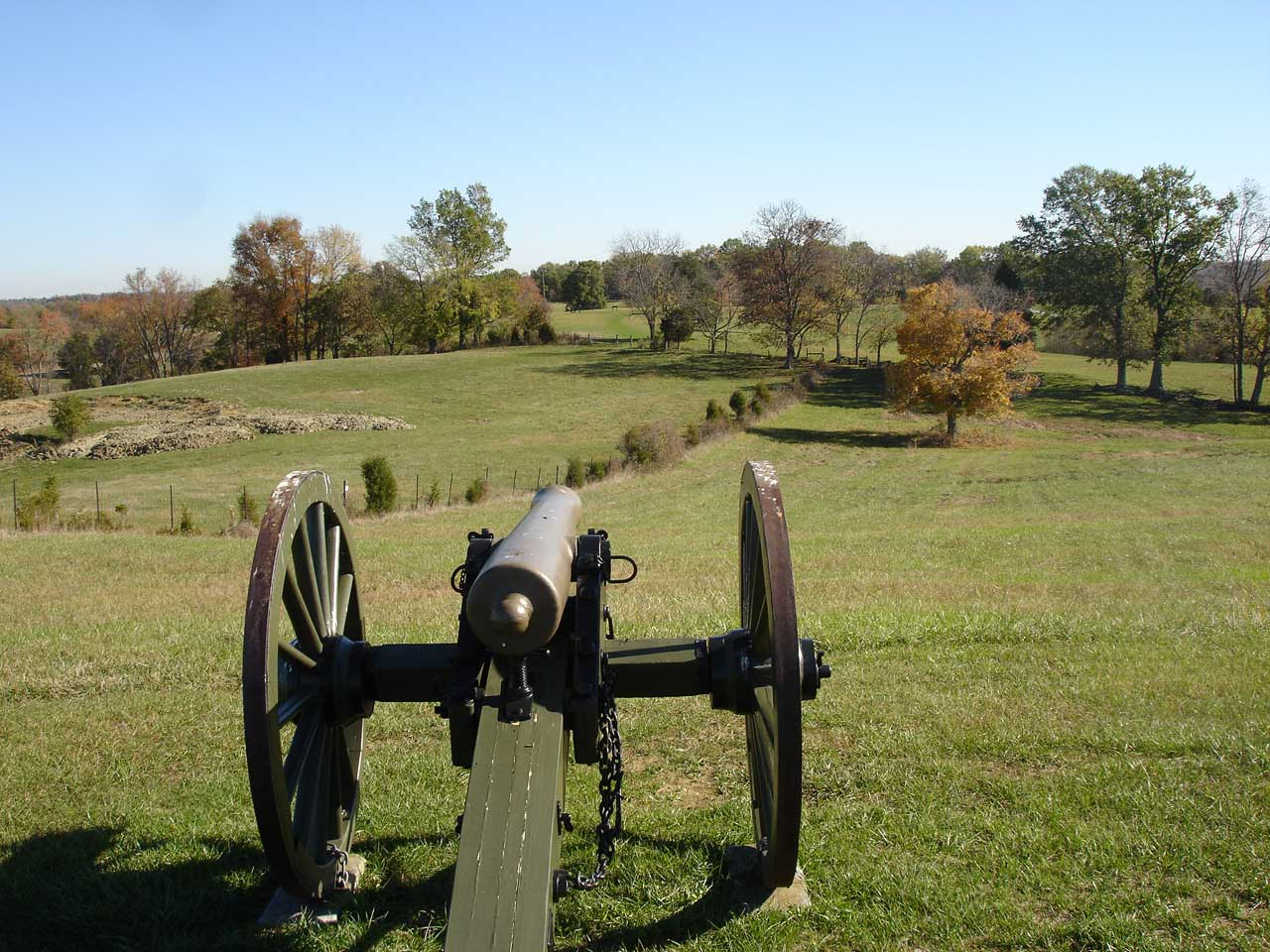
Parsons' battery position on the Open Knob, 2007.

The 33rd Brigade, including the 80th Illinois, were initially charged with guarding the artillery, called Parsons' battery, on the Open Knob, a prominent hill on the northern end of the battlefield facing the Confederate's right flank. (Note: Companies G and B were not engaged in the fight.) After some Confederate infantry snuck up the hill undetected in the woods, Terrill ordered the 123rd Illinois to mount a bayonet charge down the hill, with the raw and outnumbered troops suffering heavy casualties. At about 3:00 p.m., the 80th Illinois were sent in as reinforcements and resulted in a brief stalemate. Eventually the group was forced to retreat to the next ridge in a disjointed manner that led to much friendly fire.

The battle was the culmination of the Confederate Heartland Offensive (Kentucky Campaign). Confederate Gen. Braxton Bragg's Army of Mississippi (Note: During the battle, correspondence referred to the army as the Army of the Mississippi, deviating from the general rule that only Union armies were named after rivers. It was also sometimes referred to as the Army of the West. The army was activated on March 5, 1862, just before the Battle of Shiloh, and was renamed by Bragg as the Army of Tennessee in November. See Army of Mississippi.) arguably won a tactical victory, having fought aggressively and pushed his opponent back for over a mile. However, the battle is still considered a strategic Union victory, sometimes called the Battle for Kentucky, since Bragg withdrew to Tennessee soon thereafter. The Union retained control of the critical border state of Kentucky for the remainder of the war.

Relative to the number of troops involved, the Battle of Perryville was one of the bloodiest battles of the Civil War. It was the largest battle fought in the state of Kentucky. The 80th Illinois lost 14 killed and 58 wounded, including Lieutenant Von Kemmel killed, Lieutenant Andrews mortally wounded, and Lieutenant Colonel Rodgers and Lieutenant Pace severely wounded. Eyewitness reports suggest that three days after the fight there were still dead bodies lying on the field.

=== Streight's Raid and capture ===
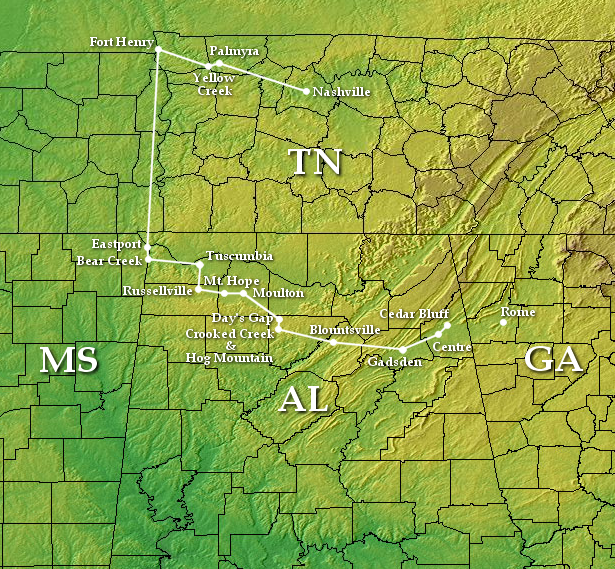
Map of locations involved in Streight's Raid

In the spring of 1863 the 80th Illinois took part in Streight's Raid in northern Alabama. The raid, led by Colonel Abel D. Streight, was intended to destroy parts of the Western and Atlantic railroad, which was supplying the Confederate Army of Tennessee. But due to poor supplies and poor planning it ended with the defeat and capture of Streight and his men at Cedar Bluff, Alabama, by Confederate General Nathan Bedford Forrest. Streight was additionally hindered by locals throughout his march, while pursued by Forrest, who had the advantage of home territory and the sympathy and aid of the local populace, most famously Emma Sansom.

The actual capture of the forces was achieved by a clever ruse, when Forrest paraded his much smaller force back and forth in front of Streight, convincing Streight that he was opposed by a superior force. After surrendering and being informed of the deception Streight reputedly demanded his arms back for a proper fight, a request cheerfully declined by Forrest.

In addition to arms, Forest's men stole the regiment's blankets, watches and money. The regiment was taken to Rome, Georgia, where they were paroled and then sent in coal cars to Atlanta. From here the officers were sent to Libby Prison while the enlisted men were sent, via Knoxville and Lynchburg, to Richmond, arriving on 13 May 1863. While the officers largely remained imprisoned for the remainder of the war, the enlisted men were sent to City Point before being exchanged for Confederate prisoners.

With Col. Thomas G. Allen having resigned and Lieutenant Colonel Andrew Rodgers and Major Erastus Newton Bates still being prisoners of war, the regiment received a new leader in the form of Lieutenant Herman Steincke.

=== Chattanooga Campaign ===
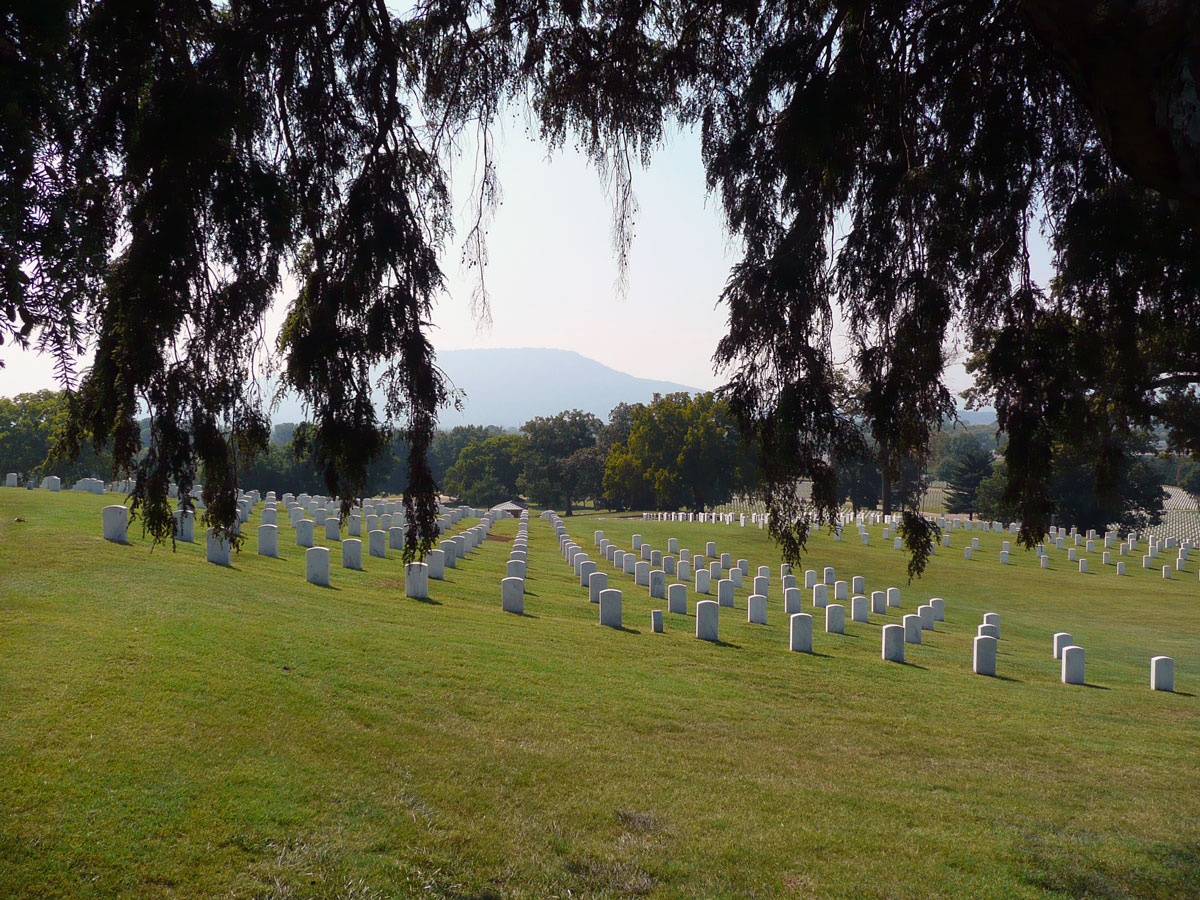
National cemetery at Chattanooga with a view of Lookout Mountain in the distance.

In October and November 1863 the regiment took part in the Chattanooga campaign, (Note: The National Park Service's Civil War Sites Advisory Commission classifies two campaigns for this period: Reopening the Tennessee River (Battle of Wauhatchie) and Chattanooga-Ringgold (the Third Battle of Chattanooga, frequently known as the Battles for Chattanooga, and the Battle of Ringgold Gap).) a series of maneuvers and battles designed to give the Union control of the state of Tennessee, including Chattanooga, known as the "Gateway to the Lower South." During this campaign they were part of the 3rd Brigade (commanded by Colonel Friedrich Hecker), 3rd Division (commanded by General Carl Schurz), and the XI Corps (commanded by General Oliver O. Howard).

On 22 November, the 80th Illinois set out toward Chattanooga and arrived in the evening east of town. The next day, on 23 November, the regiment engaged with the enemy and took the first line of rifle splits as part of the XI Corps, driving on the left flank in the enemy's skirmishers. The 80th Illinois laid in line of battle all night. This advance was part of the Union Army of the Tennessee under Maj. Gen. William T. Sherman maneuvering to launch a surprise attack against Bragg's right flank on Missionary Ridge. Meanwhile, on 24 November, Eastern Theater troops on the opposite side of the line under Maj. Gen. Joseph Hooker defeated the Confederates in the Battle of Lookout Mountain and began a movement toward Bragg's left flank at Rossville.

On 25 November, Sherman's attack on Bragg's right flank, which included the 80th Illinois, made little progress. Hoping to distract Bragg's attention, Grant authorized Thomas's army to advance in the center of his line to the base of Missionary Ridge. A combination of misunderstood orders and the pressure of the tactical situation caused Thomas's men to surge to the top of Missionary Ridge, routing the Army of Tennessee, which retreated to Dalton, Georgia, fighting off the Union pursuit successfully at the Battle of Ringgold Gap.

Bragg's defeat eliminated the last Confederate control of Tennessee and opened the door to an invasion of the Deep South, leading to Sherman's Atlanta campaign of 1864, of which the 80th Illinois also took part.

=== Atlanta campaign ===
During the summer of 1864 the regiment participated in the Western Theater's Atlanta campaign throughout northwest Georgia and the area around Atlanta. The campaign under the ultimate direction of Union Maj. Gen. William T. Sherman involved a large invading force into Georgia from the vicinity of Chattanooga, Tennessee, and was opposed by the Confederate general Joseph E. Johnston.

Johnston's Army of Tennessee withdrew toward Atlanta in the face of successive flanking maneuvers by Sherman's group of armies. In July, the Confederate president replaced Johnston with the more aggressive John Bell Hood, who began challenging the Union Army in a series of damaging frontal assaults. Hood's army was eventually besieged in Atlanta and the city fell on September 2, hastening the end of the war.

The 80th Illinois was heavily involved in all of the heavy battles of the Atlanta campaign and was constantly exposed to the enemy's fire for about three months. The 80th Illinois commenced its involvement on 3 May 1864 and participated in the battles of Dalton, Resaca, Adairsville, Cassville, Dallas, Pine Mountain, Kenesaw Mountain, Marietta, Peach Tree Creek, Atlanta, Jonesborough and Lovejoy's Station. During the campaign, the Regiment captured about 150 prisoners, and lost 25 killed and 60 wounded.

=== End of service ===
The regiment was mustered out on 10 June 1865 and proceeded to Camp Butler, Illinois, for final pay and discharge.

== Total strength and casualties ==
The regiment suffered the loss of 6 officers and 52 enlisted men who were killed in action or who died of their wounds and 160 enlisted men who died of disease, for a total of 218 fatalities. Only four of the captured officers ever returned to the Regiment. The remainder were held as prisoners until 1 March 1865, when they were paroled for exchange.

== Command history ==
Thomas G. Allen	26 August 1862 – 21 April 1863
Andrew Rodgers	21 April 1863 – 3 May 1863
Herman Steincke	3 May 1863 –
James Monroe Stookey	7 June 1864 –
Erastus Newton Bates	10 May 1865 –

== See also ==
- List of Illinois Civil War Units
- Illinois in the American Civil War
