= Marian Anderson (punk musician) =

American singer

Marian Anderson (born Marian Jennifer Holloway, August 13, 1968 – November 4, 2001) was an American punk rock singer in the San Francisco Bay Area of California. She was the lead singer of the band the Insaints and performed at the 924 Gilman Street project in Berkeley, where she was arrested for lewd and lascivious acts in 1993, claimed her acts were protected artistic speech, and was eventually acquitted. Anderson died of a heroin overdose in 2001.

== Early life ==
Holloway was born in San Francisco, California, on August 13, 1968, the first child born to Jennifer Justus and Rex Marion Holloway. When she was eight months old, the family moved to Pacific Grove, California. During her childhood she was physically and sexually abused by her violent and alcoholic father, and her parents divorced in 1974. During adolescence she ran away repeatedly, used drugs and alcohol, made multiple suicide attempts and lived in the streets for months at a time. Eventually, Holloway was transferred from her mother's custody to her grandparents' in Modesto, California. She was diagnosed with multiple mental illnesses and spent time in juvenile halls, group homes, and a mental institution. While squatting with a group of other teenagers in the abandoned San Francisco Polytechnic High School, she participated in the documentary Sadobabies.

== Career ==
=== Early bands and motherhood ===
Holloway started her first band, 5 Fingers, in Modesto in 1984. She would go on to start other groups in her teen years, such as Virgin Mary's Diary and Baby Alive, in which Kjel Anderson played bass. She married Kjel and gave birth to their daughter, Hannah Lolly Anderson, in 1988. The young couple was unable to care for their baby, and Kjel's parents adopted Hannah when she was six months old.

=== The Insaints ===
In 1986, Anderson had met Daniel Deleon at a party, in Ceres, CA. The two went on to become close friends, and to create the Insaints in 1988, with Anderson writing songs and singing lead and Deleon playing guitar. The Insaints relocated to the San Francisco Bay Area in 1990. In order to supplement her income, Anderson worked in the sex industry as a dominatrix. She also began dating Tim Yohannan, founder of the 924 Gilman Street Project.

=== Freedom of speech case ===
In 1992, Anderson began bringing some of her sex work colleagues on stage with her and incorporating sexual activities into the Insaints' performances. During a show at 924 Gilman Street, Anderson was reported to have performed acts such as urination for sexual gratification, oral copulation, vaginal penetration with bananas, and fornication with a fist. In 1993, she was arrested for sexual acts on stage and charged with three counts of lewd and lascivious behavior. The People of the State of California vs. Marian Anderson case became notorious in California, inspiring such headlines as the San Francisco Chronicle's "Slippery Rights Issue in Banana Case." Anderson claimed her acts were protected speech under the First Amendment, stating "The songs reflect my own personal feelings and society's and religion's repression of sexuality. It's me saying, 'This is my own body, and I can do whatever I like with it'." After a year in court, Anderson was acquitted of all charges.

=== Final years ===
The Insaints with Anderson performed their last show together in October 1994. Shortly after, Anderson broke up with Tim Yohannan and again attempted suicide. In 1995, she met and start dating Danielle Santos Bernal, with whom she remained in a relationship until her death. Daniel Deleon had moved to Los Angeles and in 1999, Anderson followed him there, and together they formed a new band, the Thrillkillers. She continued to work in the sex industry, and began using heroin. Anderson's body was found by her sister Lolly and Danielle Santos Bernal on November 4, 2001. Her cause of death was declared to be heroin overdose.

== Legacy ==
Four years after Anderson's death, the Insaints' first album Sins of Saints was released by Duane Peters' Disaster Records. A feature-length documentary film about Anderson's life, Last Fast Ride: The Life, Love and Death of a Punk Goddess, was released in 2011, and according to the San Francisco Bay Guardian, the film "will forever secure her legacy as one of the wildest and most outspoken women ever to pick up a microphone."
