= 51st Indiana Infantry Regiment =

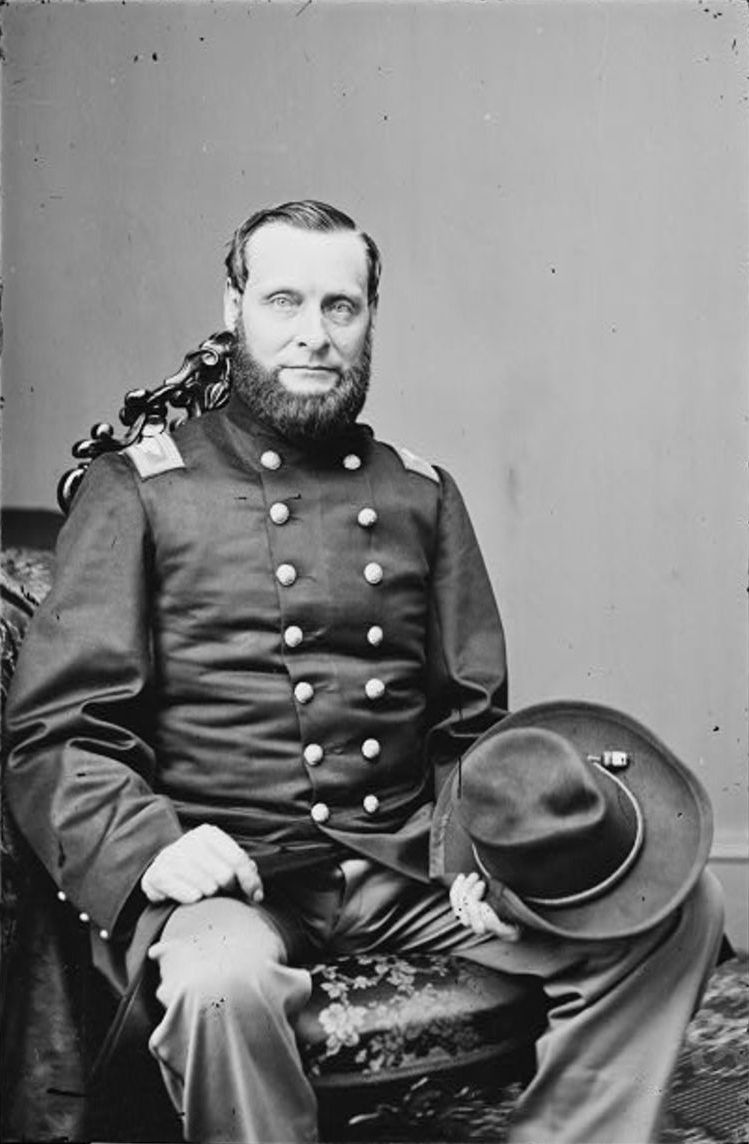
- Col. Abel Delos Streight, Commander of the 51st Indiana Infantry
- Active: December 14, 1861, to December 13, 1865
- Country: United States
- Allegiance: Union
- Branch: Infantry
- Engagements: Battle of Shiloh; Siege of Corinth; Battle of Perryville; Battle of Stones River; Streight's Raid; Tullahoma Campaign (detachment); Second Battle of Franklin; Battle of Nashville

The 51st Indiana Infantry Regiment was an infantry regiment that served in the Union Army during the American Civil War.

== Service ==
The 51st Indiana Infantry was organized and mustered in at Indianapolis, Indiana, for a three-year enlistment on December 14, 1861, under the command of Colonel Abel D. Streight.

The regiment was attached to 20th Brigade, Army of the Ohio, to January 1862. 20th Brigade, 6th Division, Army of the Ohio, to September 1862. 20th Brigade, 6th Division, II Corps, Army of the Ohio, to November 1862. 3rd Brigade, 1st Division, Left Wing, XIV Corps, Army of the Cumberland, to January 1863. 3rd Brigade, 1st Division, XXI Corps, Army of the Cumberland, to April 1863. Streight's Provisional Brigade, Army of the Cumberland, to May 1863. Prisoners of war until December 1863. Post of Chattanooga, Tennessee, Department of the Cumberland, to April 1864. 1st Separate Brigade, Chattanooga, Tennessee, Department of the Cumberland, to September 1864. 2nd Brigade, 2nd Division, IV Corps, Army of the Cumberland, to November 1864. 1st Brigade, 3rd Division, IV Corps, to August 1865. Department of Texas to December 1865.

The 51st Indiana Infantry mustered out of service at San Antonio, Texas, on December 13, 1865.

== Detailed service ==
December 14: Moved to Louisville, KY

until February 1862: to Bardstown, KY (and duty there)

February 7-March 13, 1862: March to Nashville, TN

March 29-April 6: March to Savannah, TN

April 6–7: Battle of Shiloh

April 29-May 30: Advance on and siege of Corinth, MS

May 31-June 12: Pursuit to Booneville

June to August: Buell's Campaign in northern Alabama and middle Tennessee

August 21-September 26: Guarding Memphis & Charleston Railroad. March to Louisville, KY (in pursuit of Bragg)

October 1–22: Pursuit of Bragg to London, KY

October 8: Battle of Perryville (reserve).

October 22-November 7: March to Nashville, TN

until December 26: Duty in Nashville, TN

December 25: Prim's Blacksmith Shop, Edmonson Pike

December 26–30: Advance on Murfreesboro

December 30–31, 1862 and January 1–3, 1863: Battle of Stones River

until April: Duty at Murfreesboro

January 13–15: Reconnaissance to Nolensville and Versailles

April 26-May 3: Streight's Raid to Rome, GA

April 30: Dug Gap, Sand Mountain, Crooked Creek and Hog Mountain

May 1: East Branch Black Warrior Creek

May 2: Blount's Farm

May 3: near Centre Galesville (Cedar Bluff) (where the regiment was captured)

November 1863: Exchanged

December 1863: Reorganized at Indianapolis, IN, and rejoined the army at Nashville, TN

June 23-July 7: (A detachment on Tullahoma Campaign)

until April 1864: Assigned to duty as guard on Railroad, between Nashville and Chattanooga

until September 1864: Duty at Chattanooga

until October: Duty at Atlanta

August 14–15: Action at Dalton, GA

October 3–26: Pursuit of Hood into Alabama

November–December: Nashville Campaign

November 24–27: Columbia, Duck River

November 30: Battle of Franklin

December 15–16: Battle of Nashville

December 17–28: Pursuit of Hood to the Tennessee River

December 21: Columbia

December 22: Duck River

December 14, 1864: Non-veterans mustered out

until March 1865: Moved to Huntsville, AL (and duty there)

March 15-April 22: Operations in eastern TN

until June: At Nashville

June 16: Ordered to New Orleans

July: To TX

until December: Duty at Green Lake and San Antonio

== Casualties ==
The regiment lost a total of 264 men during service; 1 officer and 55 enlisted men killed or mortally wounded, 6 officers and 202 enlisted men died of disease.

== Commanders ==
- Colonel Abel D. Streight
- Captain William W. Scearce - commanded at the battle of Nashville

== Notable members ==
- Captain Marion T. Anderson, Company D - Medal of Honor recipient, for action at Nashville
- Captain Milton Russell, Company A - Medal of Honor recipient, for action at Stones River

== See also ==
- List of Indiana Civil War regiments
- Indiana in the Civil War
