= Marion T. Anderson =

American soldier who received the Medal of Honor

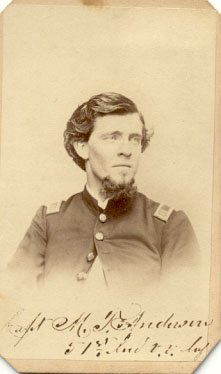
- Born: November 13, 1839; Decatur County, Indiana, U.S.
- Died: February 7, 1904 (aged 64)
- Military career
- Allegiance: United States
- Branch: United States Army; Union Army
- Service years: 1861–1865
- Rank: Captain
- Units: Company D, 51st Regiment Indiana Volunteer Infantry
- Conflicts: American Civil War
- Awards: Medal of Honor

Marion T. Anderson (November 13, 1839 – February 7, 1904) was an American soldier who received the Medal of Honor for valor during the American Civil War.

== Biography ==
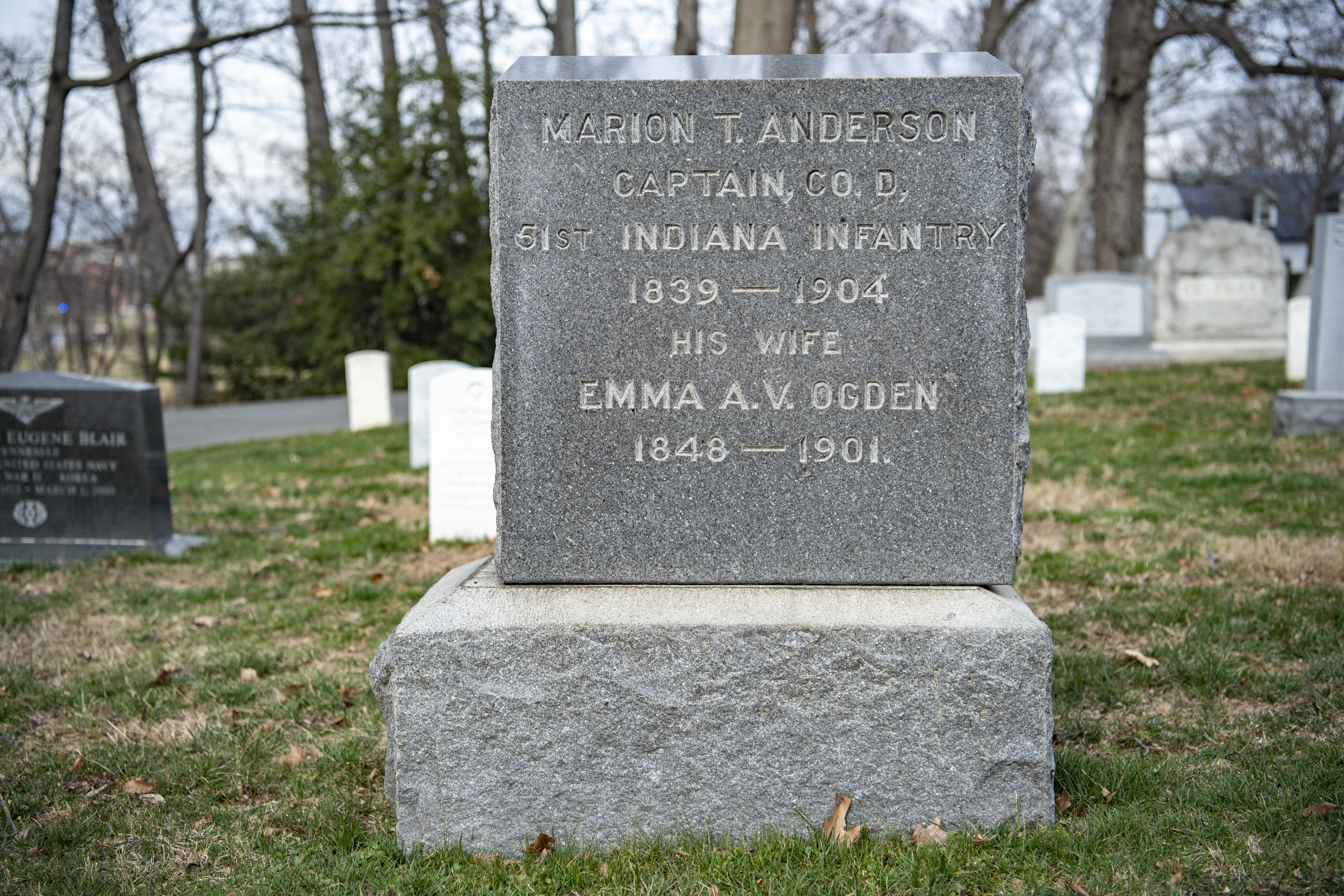
Grave at Arlington National Cemetery

Anderson served in the American Civil War in Company D, 51st Indiana Infantry for the Union Army. He received the Medal of Honor on September 1, 1893. He was a Companion of the District of Columbia Commandery of the Military Order of the Loyal Legion of the United States.

== Medal of Honor citation ==
Citation:

Led his regiment over 5 lines of the enemy's works, where he fell, severely wounded.

== See also ==
- List of American Civil War Medal of Honor recipients: A–F
