= Battle of Fort Fizzle =

1863 draft riot in Ohio

- Part of American Civil War
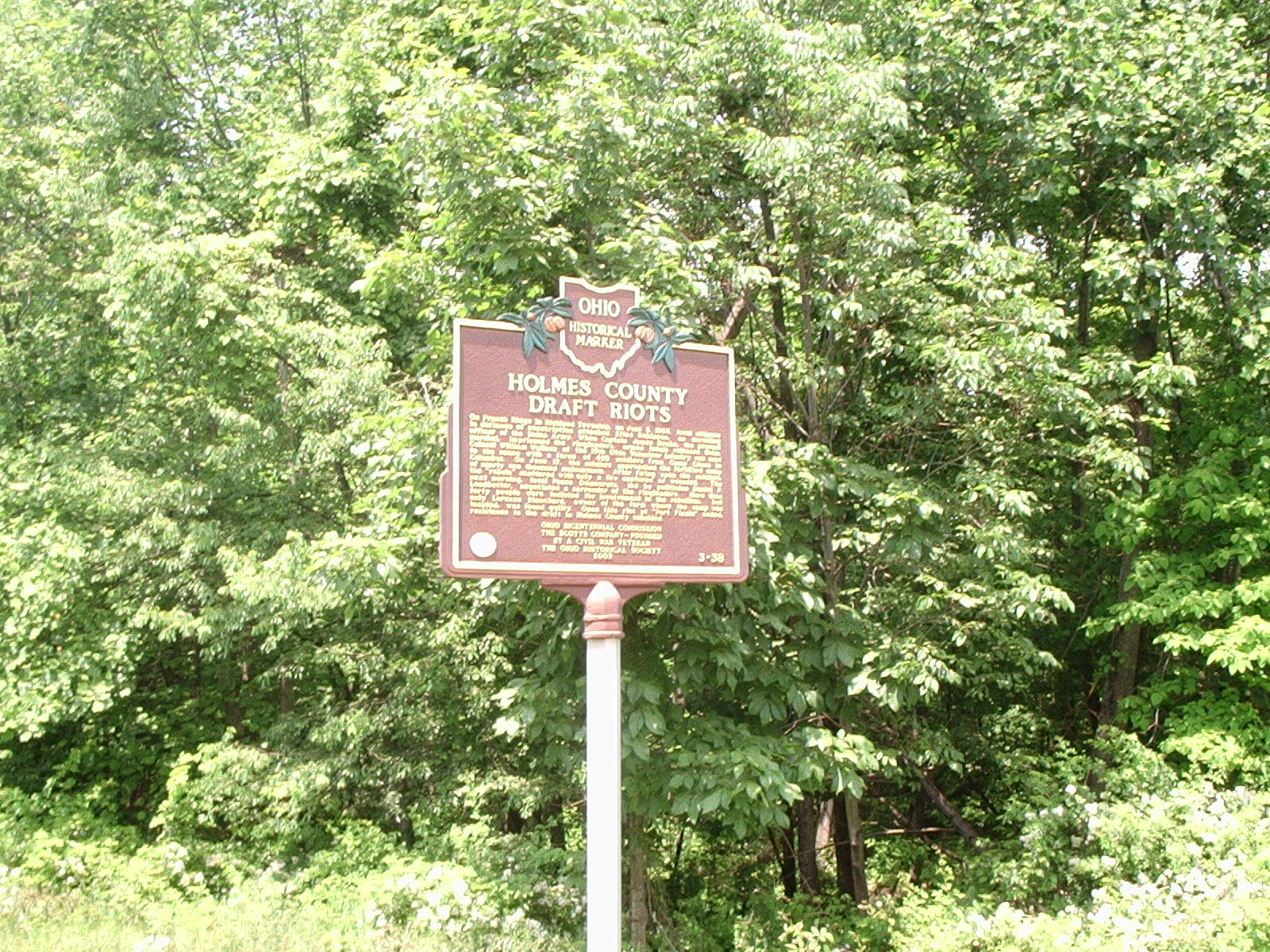
- State of Ohio Historical Marker for the event
| Date | June 17, 1863 |
| Location | Glenmont, Holmes County, Ohio 40°31′12.23″N 82°5′50.55″W |

The "Battle of Fort Fizzle" (also called the Holmes County Draft Riots and the Holmes County Rebellion) was a skirmish fought on June 17, 1863, which took place during the American Civil War in the village of Glenmont (then known as Napoleon) in Holmes County, Ohio, between Union troops and local draft resisters opposed to the Conscription Act of 1863.

Adopted by Congress on March 13, 1863, the Conscription Act authorized President Abraham Lincoln to draft men into military service in states that did not meet their volunteer quotas. When Federal officials tried to enforce the act in Holmes County in June, about 900 to 1,000 locals built a makeshift fort, equipped with four artillery pieces, to prevent the act's enforcement. After a brief encounter in which two resisters were wounded, Ohio Governor David Tod ordered a force of nearly 420 Union troops, including the 3rd Ohio Infantry, to disperse the resisters, giving the place the name "Fort Fizzle" because the rebellion had "fizzled out". The episode ended when the last four resisters who had assaulted a Federal draft official turned themselves in.

Forty-three men from the Napoleon area were indicted for assaulting an officer and preventing the execution of law (US Military Conscription Act of 1863). The armed men involved in the prisoner rescue were indicted for treason. An additional 37 men were indicted for their involvement in activities in other parts of Holmes County, and in nearby Knox and Coshocton counties.

Of the 80 men involved in these activities, the cases of just two men went to trial. Only one man, Laurant Blanchat (also known as Blanchard) was found guilty. Sentenced to six months at hard labor at the Ohio Penitentiary, Blanchat was pardoned by President Lincoln prior to the completion of the sentence. The prosecution of every other case was eventually dropped.

== Fort Fizzle, Ohio ==
In 2009, the landmark Fort Fizzle became a census designated town with the same zip code as Glenmont, Ohio.

== See also ==
- List of incidents of civil unrest in the United States
