= 144th Illinois Infantry Regiment =

144th Regiment Illinois Volunteer Infantry
- Illinois state flag
- Active: October 21, 1864, to July 14, 1865
- Country: United States
- Allegiance: Union
- Branch: Infantry

The 144th Regiment Illinois Volunteer Infantry was an infantry regiment that served in the Union Army during the American Civil War.

== Service ==
The 144th Illinois Infantry Regiment was organized at Alton, Illinois, and was mustered into Federal service on October 21, 1864, for a one-year enlistment. The regiment served in garrisons in the Saint Louis, Missouri, area and at the prisoner of war camp at Alton, Illinois. It never saw combat.

The regiment was mustered out of service 3 months early on July 14, 1865, because the war had ended.

== Total strength and casualties ==
The regiment suffered 69 enlisted men who died of disease for a total of 69 fatalities.

== Commanders ==
- Colonel Cyrus Hall - resigned March 7, 1865.
- Colonel John H. Kuhn - mustered out with the regiment.

== See also ==
- List of Illinois Civil War Units
- Illinois in the American Civil War
