= Streight's Raid =

Raid during the American Civil War

Coordinates: 34.2129°N 86.9584°W

- Part of American Civil War (1861-1865)
- Map of Streight's Raid
Date	19 April – 3 May 1863
Location	Alabama
Result	Confederate victory

Belligerents
(Confederate States of America) Confederate States	United States

Commanders and leaders
Nathan B. Forrest	(United States) Abel Streight

Strength
500	1,700

Casualties and losses
65	1,547

Streight's Raid (19 April – 3 May 1863) took place in northern Alabama during the American Civil War (1861-1865). It was led by Union Army Col. Abel D. Streight (1828-1892) and opposed by the Confederate States Army of Brig. Gen. Nathan Bedford Forrest (1820-1877), Streight's goal was to destroy parts of the Western and Atlantic Railroad, which was supplying the Confederate Army of Tennessee to the north. The raid was poorly supplied and planned, and ended with the defeat of Col. Streight and his 1,700 men at Cedar Bluff, Alabama, by Gen. Forrest who bluffed his opponent into surrendering to his 500 men in the town there. Streight was additionally hindered by Southern locals throughout his march, while pursued by Forrest, who had the advantage of knowing the home territory and the sympathy and aid of the local Alabama populace, most famously of Emma Sansom (1847-1900), who later had a statue erected for her in Gadsden, Alabama, which subsequently became controversial in 2020.

== Raid ==
The actual capture of Col. Streight's larger and better equipped forces was achieved by a clever ruse, when General Forrest paraded his much smaller force back and forth in front of Streight, convincing him that he was opposed by a superior force. After surrendering and being informed of the deception Streight reputedly demanded his arms back to prepare for a proper fight, a request cheerfully declined by Forrest.

This unsuccessful Northern raid was coordinated with the more famous Grierson's Raid, also in April-May 1863, with 1,700 mounted troopers in three regiments by Col. Benjamin Grierson (1826-1911), further west driving south around the besieged Mississippi River port town and fortress of Vicksburg down through Mississippi from LaGrange, Tennessee to the Federal-occupied state capital of Baton Rouge, Louisiana in the south, partially as a feint to confuse the scattered Confederate forces.

Union losses were 12 killed, 69 wounded, and 1,466 captured, for a total of 1,547.

== Chronology of events / locations of Streight's Raid in April-May 1863 ==
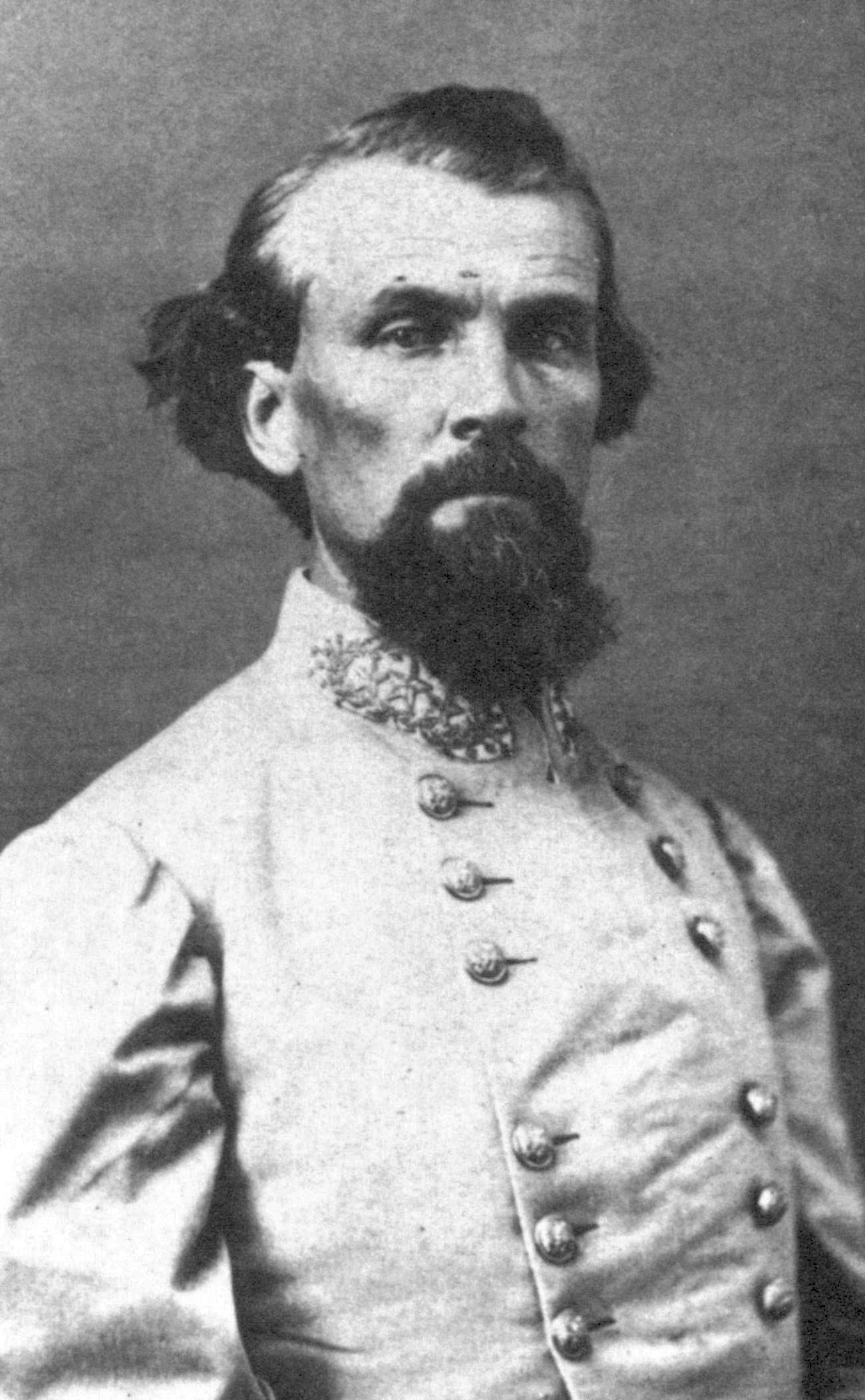
Brig. Gen. Nathan Bedford Forrest, C.S.A. (1820-1877)

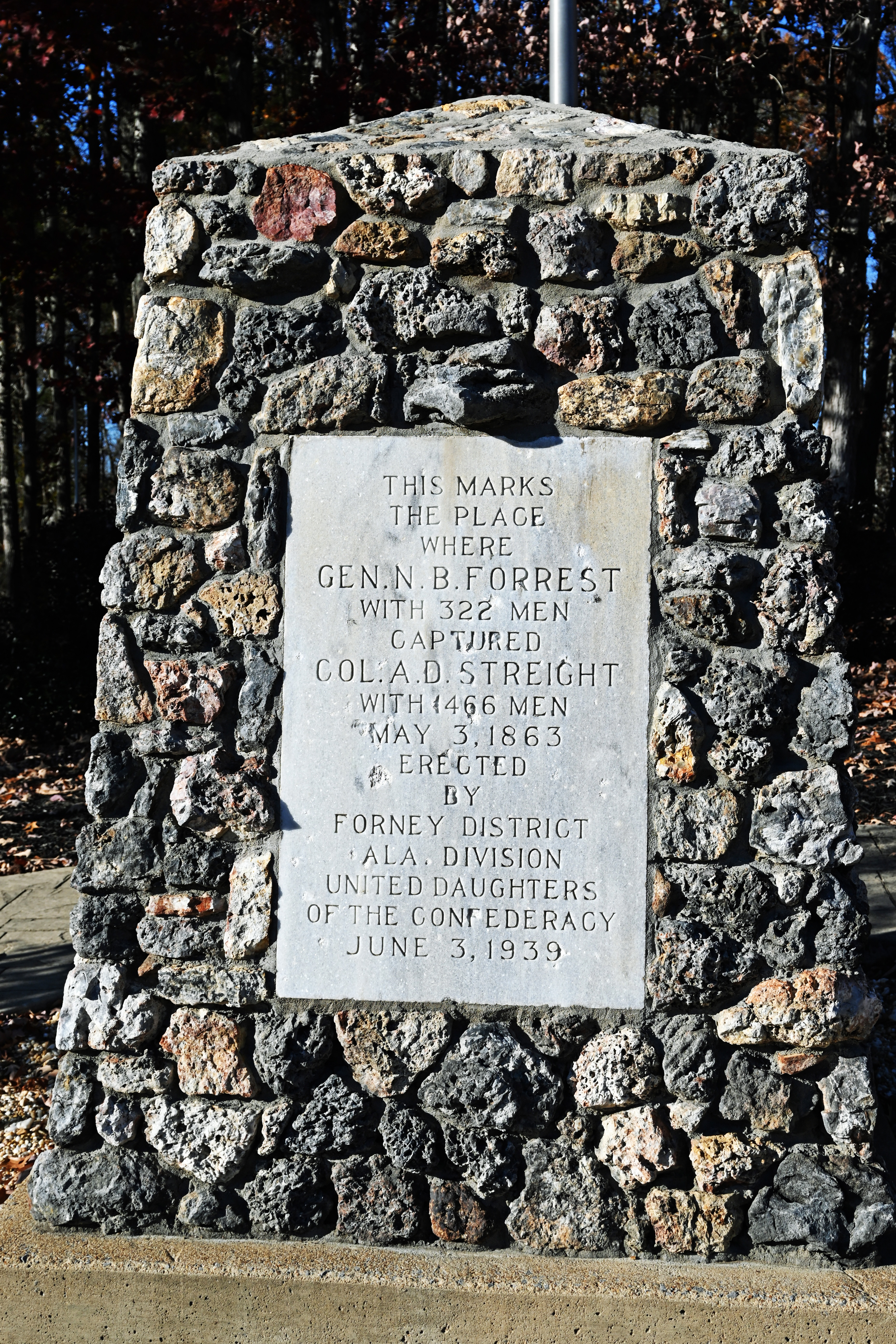
Capture site of Col. Abel

- Nashville, Tennessee (state capital) (7–10 April) — proceeded by river
- Palmyra, Tennessee (11–13 April) — proceeded on foot
- Yellow Creek, Tennessee (13–14 April) — proceeded on foot
- Fort Henry, Tennessee (15–17 April) — proceeded by river
- Eastport, Mississippi (19–21 April) — proceeded either by foot or river
- Bear Creek/River, Mississippi (22 April) — proceeded on foot the rest of the way
- Tuscumbia, Alabama (24–26 April)
- Mount Hope, Alabama (27–28 April)
- Moulton, Alabama (28 April)
- Day's Gap, Alabama (29–30 April)
- Battle of Day's Gap (30 April)
- Skirmish at Crooked Creek (30 April)
- Skirmish at Hog Mountain (30 April)
- Arrival at Blountsville (1 May)
- Skirmishes at Blountsville (1 May)
- Skirmishes at the East Branch of the Black Warrior River (1 May)
- Skirmishes at the crossing of Black Creek, near Gadsden (2 May)
- Damaged ammunition while crossing Will's Creek, near Gadsden (2 May)
- Gadsden, Alabama (2 May)
- Blount's plantation, about 15 miles from Gadsden (2 May)
- Skirmishes at/near Blount's Plantation, Cherokee County (2–3 May)
- Centre, Alabama (3 May)
- Cedar Bluff, Alabama (3 May)
- Surrender to Confederate Major General Nathan Bedford Forrest, 3 miles east of Cedar Bluff, Alabama (3 May)
- Taken east to Confederate States capital at Richmond, Virginia, as prisoners of war

== Union order of battle ==
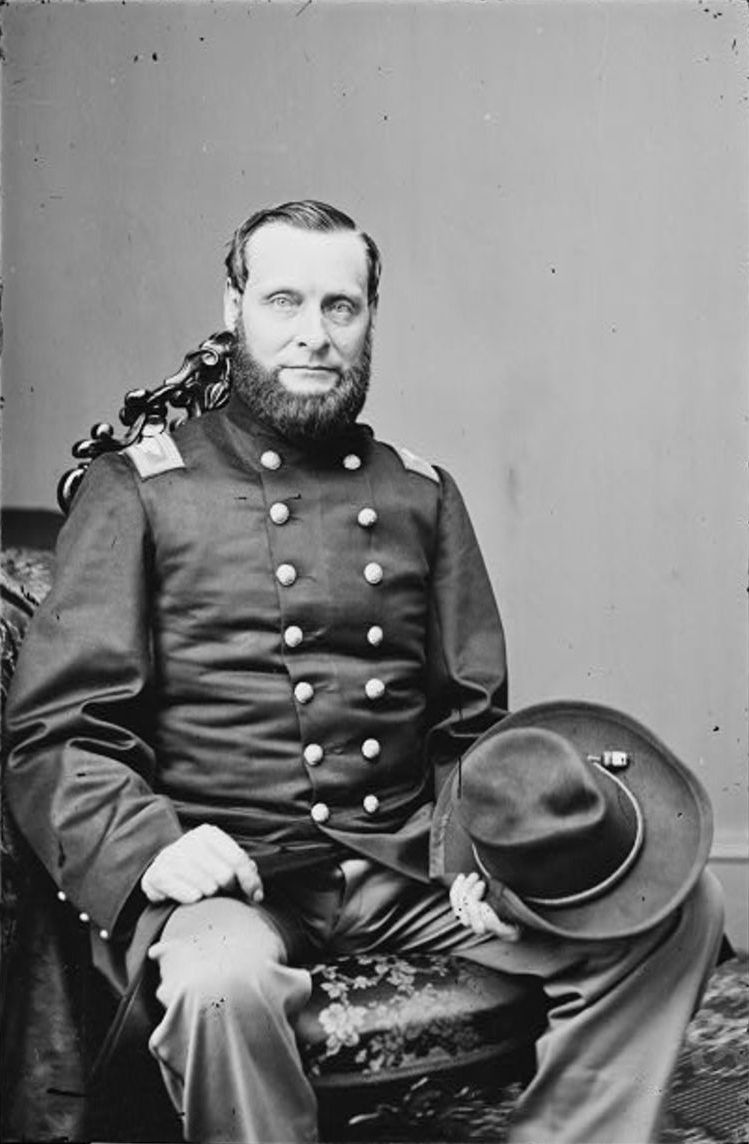
Col. Abel D. Streight, U.S.A., (1828-1892)

Colonel Abel D. Streight

- 80th Illinois Infantry Regiment
- 51st Indiana Infantry Regiment
- 73rd Indiana Infantry Regiment
- 3rd Ohio Infantry Regiment
- 1st Middle Tennessee Cavalry Regiment (2 companies)
