= 73rd Indiana Infantry Regiment =

73rd Regiment Indiana Infantry
- Active: August 16, 1862 – July 1, 1865
- Country: United States
- Allegiance: Union
- Branch: Infantry
- Engagements: Battle of Perryville; Battle of Stones River; Streight's Raid

The 73rd Regiment Indiana Infantry was an infantry regiment that served in the Union Army during the American Civil War.

== Service ==
The 73rd Indiana Infantry was organized and mustered in at Camp Rose, South Bend, Indiana for a three-year enlistment on August 16, 1862, under the command of Colonel Gilbert Hathaway.

The regiment was attached to:

- 20th Brigade, 6th Division, Army of the Ohio, September 1862.
- 20th Brigade, 6th Division, II Corps, Army of the Ohio, to November 1862.
- 3rd Brigade, 1st Division, Left Wing, XIV Corps, Army of the Cumberland, to January 1863.
- 3rd Brigade, 1st Division, XXI Corps, Army of the Cumberland, to April 1863.
- Streight's Provisional Brigade. Department of the Cumberland, to May 1863.
- Prisoners of War to December 1863.
- Post and District of Nashville, Tennessee, Department of the Cumberland, to January 1864.
- 1st Brigade, District of Nashville, Tennessee, Department of the Cumberland, January 1864.
- 1st Brigade, Rousseau's 3rd Division, XII Corps, Army of the Cumberland, to April 1864.
- 1st Brigade, 4th Division, XX Corps, Department of the Cumberland, to March 1865.
- District of Northern Alabama, Department of the Cumberland, to June 1865.

The 73rd Indiana Infantry mustered out of service on July 1, 1865.

== Detailed service ==
- Ordered to Lexington, Kentucky. Evacuation of Lexington August 31.
- Pursuit of Bragg, to London, Kentucky, October 1–22, 1862.
- Battle of Perryville, October 8 (reserve).
- March to Nashville, Tennessee, October 22-November 9, and duty there until December 26.
- Advance on Murfreesboro, Tennessee, December 26–30.
- Battle of Stones River December 30–31, 1862 and January 1–3, 1863.
- Duty at Murfreesboro until April.
- Reconnaissance to Nolensville and Versailles January 13–15.
- Streight's Raid to Rome, Georgia, April 26-May 3. End of Streight's Raid was a 3-day running battle across 120 miles of Alabama Wilderness.
- Day's Gap - April 30
- Sand Mountain - April 30
- Crooked Creek - April 30
- Hog Mountain - April 30
- East Branch - May 1
- Black Warrior Creek - May 1
- Blount's Farm - May 2
- Centre - May 2
- Cedar Bluff - May 3
- Regiment captured at Cedar Bluff, AL, May 3 by CS General Nathan Bedford Forrest.
- Reorganized and rejoined army at Nashville, Tennessee, December 1863.
- Guard duty along Nashville & Chattanooga Railroad, and picketing Tennessee River from Draper's Ferry to Limestone Point. Headquarters at Triana until September 1864.
- Paint Rock Bridge April 8, 1864.
- Scout from Triana to Somerville July 29 (detachment).
- Action at Athens, Alabama, October 1–2.
- Defense of Decatur October 26–29.
- Duty at Stevenson, Alabama, until January 1865.
- At Huntsville, Alabama, and along Mobile & Charleston Railroad until July.
- Gurley's Tank February 16, 1865 (detachment).

== Casualties ==
The regiment lost a total of 241 men during service; 3 officers and 41 enlisted men killed or mortally wounded, 191 enlisted men died of disease.

== Commanders ==
- Colonel Gilbert Hathaway - killed in action at Blount's Farm, May 2, 1863
- Colonel Alfred B. Wade

== Notable members ==
- Lieutenant Colonel Ivan N. Walker - 24th Commander-in-Chief, Grand Army of the Republic, 1895–1896
- Job Barnard, First Sergeant in Company K

== See also ==
- List of Indiana Civil War regiments
- Indiana in the Civil War
