= 3rd Ohio Infantry Regiment =

- Active: 1861–64
- Country: United States
- Allegiance: Union
- Branch: Volunteer Army
- Type: Infantry
- Size: ~1,000 soldiers at outset of the war
- Engagements: Battle of Rich Mountain; Battle of Cheat Mountain; Tullahoma Campaign; Battle of Perryville; Battle of Stones River; Streight's Raid; Morgan's Raid

Commanders
- Notable commanders: John Beatty, J. Warren Keifer

The 3rd Ohio Infantry Regiment (or 3rd OVI) was an infantry regiment in the Union Army during the American Civil War. It served in several important campaigns in the Western Theater in Kentucky, Tennessee, and Alabama.

== Three-months regiment ==
With the outbreak of the Civil War, President Abraham Lincoln called for 75,000 volunteers to help put down the rebellion. Ohioans responded well, and several new regiments were enrolled for a term of three months, thought to be long enough to end the war. The 3rd Ohio Infantry Regiment was organized at Camp Jackson in Columbus on April 25, 1861, under Colonel Isaac Morrow, Lieutenant Colonel John Beatty, and Major J. Warren Keifer. The regiment moved to newly constructed Camp Dennison near Cincinnati on April 28, and served on garrison duty there until June 12, at which time many of the men joined the newly reorganized three-years regiment with the same numerical designation. Those three months men who elected not to join the three-years regiment were mustered out on July 24.

== Three-years regiment ==
=== Early service ===
The three-years 3rd Ohio Infantry Regiment was organized at Camp Dennison on June 12, 1861. After a few days of training and drilling, it moved to Grafton, Virginia (now West Virginia) and then on to Clarksburg on June 20–25, where it was attached to the 1st Brigade, Army of Occupation, West Virginia, until September. The regiment saw action in the West Virginia Campaign, capturing the Confederate-held town of Beverly on July 12. They remained on duty in western Virginia through the balance of the year, fighting in several small skirmishes and battles, including the battles of Rich Mountain and Cheat Mountain.

In October, the 3rd Ohio Infantry was shipped to Louisville, Kentucky, and served for the rest of the war in the Western Theater. After wintering near Elizabethtown, Kentucky, the regiment, then in the army of Ormsby Mitchel, was part of the general advance on Confederate-held Nashville, Tennessee, in February 1862. After occupying the city, the 9th moved toward Murfreesboro, Tennessee and assisted in capturing the city of Huntsville, Alabama, on April 11. The 3rd Ohio remained in Alabama until late August when it was part of the Union forces that pursued Braxton Bragg's Confederate army during the Kentucky Campaign.

On October 8, 1862, the 3rd Ohio Infantry was heavily involved at the Battle of Perryville. Two weeks later, it marched back to Murfreesboro and remained there through the winter, participating in the Battle of Stones River at year's end.

In April 1863, the regiment was part of Streight's Raid to Rome, Georgia from April 26 until May 3. It was involved in fights at Day's Gap, Sand Mountain, and Crooked Creek and Hog Mountain. Much of the regiment was captured on May 3 near Rome and taken as prisoners of war. The officers and men were sent to Belle Isle and Libby Prison. The captives were exchanged later that month and sent northward to Camp Chase in Columbus, Ohio, to reorganize.

In June, the regiment helped quell the Holmes County Rebellion, and a month later was involved in the pursuit of Morgan's Raiders. On August 1, the regiment was transported to Nashville and then on to Bridgeport, Alabama, where it was on guard duty until October. Then, it was part of the Union expedition against Confederates under Nathan Bedford Forrest. On November 27, the regiment was sent to the rear lines to perform garrison duty at Chattanooga, Tennessee, until June 1864. It was then ordered back to Camp Dennison on June 9, where it mustered out June 23, 1864.

During its term of service, the 3rd Ohio Infantry lost 4 officers and 87 enlisted men killed and mortally wounded, and 3 officers and 78 enlisted men by disease, for a total of 172 fatalities.

== Affiliations, battle honors, detailed service, and casualties ==
=== Organizational affiliation ===
Attached to:

- 1st Brigade, Army of Occupation, West Virginia, to September 1861
- 1st Brigade, Reynolds' Command, West Virginia, to November 1861
- 17th Brigade, Army of the Ohio (AoO), to December 1861.
- 17th Brigade, 3rd Division, AoO, to September 1862.
- 17th Brigade, 3rd Division, I Corps, AoO, to November 1862.
- 2nd Brigade, 1st Division, Center Wing, XIV Corps, Army of the Cumberland (AoC), to January 1863.
- 2nd Brigade, 1st Division, XIV Corps, AoC, to April 1863.
- Streight's Provisional Brigade, XIV Corps, AoC, to May 1863.
- Unattached, Department of the Cumberland, August to November, 1863
- 2nd Brigade, 1st Division, XIV Corps, to April, 1864.
- Garrison at Chattanooga, TN, to June, 1864

=== List of battles ===
The official list of battles in which the regiment bore a part:

- Battle of Rich Mountain
- Battle of Cheat Mountain
- Tullahoma Campaign
- Battle of Perryville
- Battle of Stones River
- Streight's Raid
- Morgan's Raid

=== Detailed service ===
==== 1861 ====
- Mustered into federal service April 17, 1861
- Moved to Washington, DC, April 19
- Duty in the defenses of that city to July
- Actions at Vienna, VA June 17 and July 9
- McDowell's advance on Manassas, VA, July 16–21
- Occupation of Fairfax Court House, VA, July 17
- Battle of Bull Run, July 21
- Cover retreat to Washington
- Ordered to Ohio and mustered out July 31, 1861, expiration of term
- Three year regiment organized at Camp Dennison, OH, July 17-September 20, 1861
- Mustered into federal service September 4, 1861
- Left state for Kentucky September 4
- Operations in vicinity of Olympian Springs, KY, until November
- Action at West Liberty, KY October 23
- To Olympian Springs, November 4
- Battle of Ivy Mountain, November 8
- Moved to Piketown, KY, November 8–9
- Moved to Louisville, KY, thence to camp at Bacon Creek, until February, 1862

==== 1862 ====
- Advance on Bowling Green, KY, and Nashville, TN, February 10–25
- Occupation of Nashville February 25-March 16
- Advance on Murfreesboro, TN March 17–19
- Advance on Huntsville, AL, April 4–11
- Great Locomotive Chase on Macon and Western Railroad, April 7–12 (Detachment)
- Capture of Huntsville, April 11
- Action at West Bridge and occupation of Bridgeport, AL, April 29
- Duty Near Pulaski May 1
- Duty along Memphis & Charleston Railroad until August 30
- Actions at Battle Creek June 21 and July 20
- March to Louisville, in pursuit of Bragg August 21-September 26
- Pursuit of Bragg to Crab Orchard, KY, October 1–15
- Battle of Perryville October 8
- March to Nashville, Tenn., October 16-November 7 and duty there until December 26
- Advance on Murfreesboro, TN December 26–30
- Battle of Stones River December 30, 1862 - January 3, 1863

==== 1863 ====
- Duty at and near Murfreesboro until June
- Middle Tennessee or Tullahoma Campaign June 23-July 7
- Battle of Hoover's Gap, June 24–26
- Occupation of Middle Tennessee until August 16
- Passage of Cumberland Mountains and Tennessee River, and Chickamauga Campaign August 16-September 24
- Battle of Chickamauga September 19–20
- Rossville Gap September 21
- Siege of Chattanooga, TN, September 24-November 23
- Chattanooga-Ringgold Campaign November 23–27
- Orchard Knob November 23
- Lookout Mountain November 24
- Battle of Missionary Ridge November 25
- Pea Vine Valley November 26
- Graysville, AL, November 26
- Ringgold, GA, November 27-February 21, 1864

==== 1864 ====
- Reconnaissance of Dalton, GA, February 22–27
- Atlanta Campaign May 1 to July 25
- Skirmishes at Tunnel Hill, May 6–7
- Demonstration on Rocky Faced Ridge and Dalton May 8–11
- Battle of Resaca May 14–15
- Advance on Dallas May 18–25
- Operations on line of Pumpkin Vine Creek and battles about Dallas, New Hope Church and Allatoona Hills May 25-June 5
- Battle of Pickett's Mill May 27
- Kingston, GA June 1
- Operations about Marietta and against Kennesaw Mountain June 10-July 2
- Pine Hill June 11–14
- Lost Mountain June 15–17
- Assault on Kennesaw June 27
- Ruff's Station July 4
- Chattahoochie River July 5–17
- Buckhead, Nancy's Creek, July 18
- Peach Tree Creek July 19–20
- Siege of Atlanta July 22–26
- Ordered to Chattanooga, August 1
- Ordered to the rear for muster out
- Mustered out October 10, 1864, expiration of term
- Recruits transferred to 18th Ohio Volunteer Infantry October 31

=== Casualties ===
The regiment lost a total of 172 men during service; 4 officers and 87 enlisted men killed or mortally wounded, 3 officers and 78 enlisted men died of disease.

== See also ==
- Ohio in the Civil War
- 148th Infantry Regiment (United States)

== Flags ==
The regiment was known to have carried four flags, they were given to the unit on November 2, 1861. One was the National flag with the name of the regiment on a red stripe. Another was a blue regimental flag bearing an bald eagle with its wing spread out in the center of the field, bearing on its chest a shield in red, white and blue. In its beak is the National motto; "E Pluribus Unum" and below the bird is the name of the regiment. The other two were guide flags made of white silk with gold fringed.
