= Battle of Chickamauga order of battle: Confederate =

American Civil War order of battle

The following Confederate States Army units and commanders fought in the Battle of Chickamauga of the American Civil War. The Union order of battle is listed separately. Order of battle compiled from the army organization during the campaign.

== Abbreviations used ==
=== Military rank ===
- Gen = General
- LTG = Lieutenant General
- MG = Major General
- BG = Brigadier General
- Col = Colonel
- Ltc = Lieutenant Colonel
- Maj = Major
- Cpt = Captain
- Lt = Lieutenant

=== Other ===
- w = wounded
- mw = mortally wounded
- k = killed
- c = captured

== Army of Tennessee (September 19, 1863) ==
Gen Braxton Bragg, Commanding

Escort: Cpt Guy Dreux

- Dreux's Company, Louisiana Cavalry: Lt O. De Buis
- Holloway's Company, Alabama Cavalry: Cpt E. M. Holloway

=== Polk's Corps ===
LTG Leonidas Polk

Escort:

- Greenleaf's Company, Louisiana Cavalry: Cpt Leeds Greenleaf (Corps headquarters)
- Company G, 2nd Georgia Cavalry: Cpt Thomas M. Merritt (Cheatham's Division)
- Lenoir's Company, Alabama Cavalry: Cpt T.M. Lenoir (Hindman's Division)

Division	Brigade	Regiments and Others
Cheatham's Division MG Benjamin F. Cheatham	Jackson's Brigade BG John K. Jackson	2nd Battalion, 1st Confederate: Maj James C. Gordon; 5th Georgia: Col Charles P. Daniel; 2nd Georgia Battalion Sharpshooters: Maj Richard H. Whiteley; 5th Mississippi: Ltc W. L. Sykes, Maj John B. Herring; 8th Mississippi: Col John C. Wilkinson
Cheatham's Division MG Benjamin F. Cheatham	Smith's Brigade BG Preston Smith (k); Col Alfred J. Vaughan, Jr.	11th Tennessee: Col George W. Gordon; 12th-47th Tennessee Col William M. Watkins; 13th-154th Tennessee: Col A. J. Vaughan, Ltc R.W. Pitman; 29th Tennessee: Col Horace Rice; Dawson's Battalion Sharpshooters: Maj J.W. Dawson, Maj William Green, Maj James Purl
Cheatham's Division MG Benjamin F. Cheatham	Maney's Brigade BG George Maney	1st-27th Tennessee: Col Hume R. Field; 4th Tennessee (Provisional Army): Col James A. McMurry, Ltc Robert N. Lewis, Maj Oliver A. Bradshaw, Cpt Joseph Bostick; 6th-9th Tennessee: Col George C. Porter; 24th Tennessee Battalion Sharpshooters: Maj Frank Maney
Cheatham's Division MG Benjamin F. Cheatham	Wright's Brigade BG Marcus J. Wright	8th Tennessee: Col John H. Anderson; 16th Tennessee: Col D. M. Donnell; 28th Tennessee: Col Sidney S. Stanton; 38th Tennessee: Col John C. Carter; 51st-52nd Tennessee: Ltc John G. Hall; 22nd Tennessee Battalion: Maj Thomas B. Murray
Cheatham's Division MG Benjamin F. Cheatham	Strahl's Brigade BG Otho F. Strahl	4th-5th Tennessee: Col Jonathan J. Lamb; 19th Tennessee: Col Francis Marion Walker; 24th Tennessee: Col John A. Wilson; 31st Tennessee: Col Egbert E. Tansil; 33rd Tennessee: Col Warner P. Jones
Cheatham's Division MG Benjamin F. Cheatham	Artillery Maj Melancthon Smith	Carnes' (Tennessee) Battery: Cpt William W. Carnes; Scogin's (Georgia) Battery: Cpt John Scogin; Scott's (Tennessee) Battery: Lt John H. Marsh, Lt A. T. Watson, Cpt William L. Scott; Smith's (Mississippi) Battery: Lt William B. Turner; Stanford's (Mississippi) Battery: Cpt Thomas J. Stanford
Hindman's Division BG Patton Anderson; MG Thomas C. Hindman	Anderson's Brigade Col Jacob H. Sharp; BG Patton Anderson	7th Mississippi: Col W. H. Bishop; 9th Mississippi: Maj T. H. Lynam; 10th Mississippi: Ltc James Barr; 41st Mississippi: Col. W. F. Tucker; 44th Mississippi: Col J. H. Sharp, Ltc R. G. Kelsey; 9th Mississippi Battalion Sharpshooters: Maj W. C. Richards; Garrity's (Alabama) Battery: Cpt James Garrity
Hindman's Division BG Patton Anderson; MG Thomas C. Hindman	Deas' Brigade BG Zach C. Deas	19th Alabama: Col Samuel K. McSpadden; 22nd Alabama: Ltc John Weedon, Cpt Harry T. Toulmin; 25th Alabama: Col George D. Johnston; 39th Alabama: Col Whitfield Clark; 50th Alabama: Col John G. Coltart; 17th Alabama Battalion Sharpshooters: Cpt James F. Nabers; Dent's (Alabama) Battery: Cpt S. H. Dent
Hindman's Division BG Patton Anderson; MG Thomas C. Hindman	Manigault's Brigade BG Arthur M. Manigault	24th Alabama: Col N. N. Davis; 28th Alabama: Col John C. Reid; 34th Alabama: Maj John N. Slaughter; 10th-19th South Carolina: Col James F. Pressley; Waters' (Alabama) Battery: Lt Charles W. Watkins

=== Hill's Corps ===
LTG Daniel H. Hill

Escort:

- Sanders' Company Tennessee Cavalry: Cpt C. F. Sanders (Cleburne's Division)
- Foules' Company, Mississippi Cavalry: Cpt H. L. Foules (Breckinridge's Division)

Division	Brigade	Regiments and Others
Cleburne's Division MG Patrick Cleburne	Wood's Brigade BG Sterling A. M. Wood	16th Alabama: Maj John H. McGaughy, Cpt Frederick A. Ashford; 33rd Alabama: Col Samuel Adams; 45th Alabama: Col E. B. Breedlove; Gibson's (18th) Alabama Battalion: Maj John H. Gibson (attached to 33rd Alabama); 32nd-45th Mississippi: Col Mark P. Lowrey; 15th Mississippi Battalion Sharpshooters: Maj A. T. Hawkins, Cpt Daniel Coleman
Cleburne's Division MG Patrick Cleburne	Polk's Brigade BG Lucius E. Polk	1st Arkansas: Col John W. Colquitt; 3rd-5th Confederate: Col James A. Smith; 2nd Tennessee: Col William D. Robison; 35th Tennessee: Col Benjamin J. Hill; 48th Tennessee: Col George H. Nixon
Cleburne's Division MG Patrick Cleburne	Deshler's Brigade BG James Deshler	19th-24th Arkansas: Ltc A. S. Hutchison; 6th-10th Texas Infantry-15th Texas Cavalry (dismounted): Col Roger Q. Mills, Ltc T. Scott Anderson; 17th-18th-24th-25th Texas Cavalry (dismounted): Col F. C. Wilkes, Ltc John T. Coit, Maj William A. Ryan
Cleburne's Division MG Patrick Cleburne	Artillery Maj Thomas R. Hotchkiss (w); Cpt Henry C. Semple	Calvert's (Arkansas) Battery: Lt Thomas J. Key; Douglas's Texas Battery: Cpt James P. Douglas; Semple's (Alabama) Battery: Cpt Henry C. Semple, Lt R. W. Goldthwaite
Breckinridge's Division MG John C. Breckinridge
Breckinridge's Division MG John C. Breckinridge	Helm's Brigade BG Benjamin Helm	41st Alabama: Col Martin L. Stansel; 2nd Kentucky: Ltc James W. Hewitt, Ltc James W. Moss; 4th Kentucky: Col Joseph P. Nuckols, Maj Thomas W. Thompson; 6th Kentucky: Col Joseph H. Lewis, Ltc Martin H. Cofer; 9th Kentucky: Col John W. Caldwell, Ltc John C. Wickliffe
Breckinridge's Division MG John C. Breckinridge	Adams' Brigade BG Daniel W. Adams	32nd Alabama: Maj John C. Kimbell, Col Randall L. Gibson; 13th-20th Louisiana: Col Leon von Zinken, Cpt E. M. Dubroca; 16th-25th Louisiana: Col Daniel Gober; 19th Louisiana: Ltc Richard W. Turner, Maj Loudon Butler, Cpt H. A. Kennedy; 14th Louisiana Battalion: Maj J. E. Austin
Breckinridge's Division MG John C. Breckinridge	Stovall's Brigade BG Marcellus A. Stovall	1st-3rd Florida: Col William S. Dilworth; 4th Florida: Col W. L. L. Bowen; 47th Georgia: Cpt William S. Phillips, Cpt Joseph S. Cone; 60th North Carolina: Ltc James M. Ray, Cpt James Thomas Weaver
Breckinridge's Division MG John C. Breckinridge	Artillery Maj Rice E. Graves	Cobb's (Kentucky) Battery: Cpt Robert Cobb; Graves' (Kentucky) Battery: Lt S. M. Spencer; Mebane's (Tennessee) Battery: Cpt John W. Mebane; Slocomb's (Louisiana) Battery: Cpt C. H. Slocomb

=== Buckner's Corps ===
MG Simon Bolivar Buckner, Sr.

Escort:

- Clark's Company, Tennessee Cavalry: Cpt J. W. Clark (Corps headquarters)

Division	Brigade	Regiments and Others
Stewart's Division MG Alexander P. Stewart	Bate's Brigade BG William B. Bate	58th Alabama: Col Bushrod Jones; 37th Georgia: Col A. F. Rudler, Ltc Joseph T. Smith; 4th Georgia Battalion Sharpshooters: Maj T. D. Caswell, Cpt B. M. Turner, Lt Joel Towers; 15th-37th Tennessee: Col Robert C. Tyler, Ltc R. Dudley Frayser, Cpt R. M. Tankesley; 20th Tennessee: Col Thomas B. Smith, Maj W. M. Shy
Stewart's Division MG Alexander P. Stewart	Brown's Brigade BG John C. Brown	18th Tennessee: Col Joseph B. Palmer (w), Ltc William R. Butler, Cpt Gideon H. Lowe; 26th Tennessee: Col John M. Lillard, Maj Richard M. Saffell; 32nd Tennessee: Col Edmund C. Cook, Cpt Calaway G. Tucker; 45th Tennessee: Col Anderson Searcy; 23rd Tennessee Battalion: Maj Tazewell W. Newman, Cpt W. P. Simpson
Stewart's Division MG Alexander P. Stewart	Clayton's Brigade BG Henry De Lamar Clayton, Sr.	18th Alabama: Col James T. Holtzclaw, Ltc R. F. Inge, Maj P. F. Hunley; 36th Alabama: Col Lewis T. Woodruff; 38th Alabama: Ltc A. R. Lankford
Stewart's Division MG Alexander P. Stewart	Artillery Maj John W. Eldridge	1st Arkansas Battery: Cpt John T. Humphreys; T. H. Dawson's (Georgia) Battery: Lt R. W. Anderson; Eufaula Artillery (Alabama Battery): Cpt McDonald Oliver
Preston's Division BG William Preston	Gracie's Brigade BG Archibald Gracie, Jr.	43rd Alabama: Col Young M. Moody; 1st Battalion, Hilliard's Alabama Legion: Ltc John H. Holt, Cpt George W. Huguley; 2nd Battalion, Hilliard's Alabama Legion: Ltc Bolling Hall, Jr., Cpt W. D. Walden; 3rd Battalion, Hilliard's Alabama Legion: Ltc John W. A. Sanford; 4th Battalion, Hilliard's Alabama Legion: Maj John D. McLennan; 63rd Tennessee: Ltc Abraham Fulkerson, Maj John A. Aiken
Preston's Division BG William Preston	3rd Brigade Col John H. Kelly	65th Georgia: Col R. H. Moore; 5th Kentucky: Col Hiram Hawkins; 58th North Carolina: Col John B. Palmer (w); 63rd Virginia: Maj James M. French
Preston's Division BG William Preston	Trigg's Brigade Col Robert C. Trigg	1st Florida Cavalry (dismounted): Col G. Troup Maxwell; 6th Florida: Col J. J. Finley; 7th Florida: Col Robert Bullock; 54th Virginia: Ltc John J. Wade
Preston's Division BG William Preston	9th Georgia Artillery Battalion Maj William A. Leyden	Company C: Cpt Andrew M. Wolihin; Company D: Cpt Tyler M. Peeples; Jeffress' (Virginia) Battery: Cpt William C. Jeffress
	Corps Reserve Artillery Maj Samuel C. Williams	Kolb's (Alabama) Battery: Cpt R. F. Kolb; McCants' (Florida) Battery: Cpt Robert P. McCants; Darden's (Mississippi) Battery: Cpt Putnam Darden; Baxter's (Tennessee) Battery: Cpt Edmund D. Baxter

=== Reserve Corps ===
MG William H. T. Walker

Division	Brigade	Regiments and Others
Walker's Division MG William H. T. Walker	Ector's Brigade BG Matthew D. Ector	Stone's (Alabama) Battalion Sharpshooters: Maj T. O. Stone; Pound's (Mississippi) Battalion Sharpshooters: Cpt M. Pound; 29th North Carolina: Col William B. Creasman; 9th Texas: Col William Hugh Young; 10th Texas Cavalry (dismounted): Ltc C. R. Earp; 14th Texas Cavalry (dismounted): Col John L. Camp; 32nd Texas Cavalry (dismounted): Col Julius A. Andrews
Walker's Division MG William H. T. Walker	Wilson's Brigade Col Claudius C. Wilson	25th Georgia: Ltc A. J. Williams; 29th Georgia: Ltc George R. McRae; 30th Georgia: Ltc James S. Boynton; 1st Georgia Battalion Sharpshooters: Maj Arthur Shaaff; 4th Louisiana Battalion: Ltc John McEnery
Walker's Division MG William H. T. Walker	Artillery	Howell's (Georgia) Battery: Cpt Evan Howell
Liddell's Division BG St. John R. Liddell	Liddell's Brigade Col Daniel C. Govan	2nd-15th Arkansas: Ltc Reuben F. Harvey, Cpt A. T. Meek; 5th-13th Arkansas: Col L. Featherston (k), Ltc John E. Murray; 6th-7th Arkansas: Col D. A. Gillespie, Ltc Peter Snyder; 8th Arkansas: Ltc George F. Baucum, Maj A. Watkins; 1st Louisiana (Regulars) (attached to 8th Arkansas)
Liddell's Division BG St. John R. Liddell	Walthall's Brigade BG Edward C. Walthall	24th Mississippi: Ltc R. P. McKelvaine, Maj W. C. Staples, Cpt B. F. Toomer, Cpt J. D. Smith; 27th Mississippi: Col James A. Campbell; 29th Mississippi: Col William F. Brantley; 30th Mississippi: Col Junius I. Scales (c), Ltc Hugh A. Reynolds (k), Maj James M. Johnson (w); 34th Mississippi: Maj William G. Pegram (w), Cpt H. J. Bowen
Liddell's Division BG St. John R. Liddell	Artillery Cpt Charles Swett	Fowler's (Alabama) Battery: Cpt William H. Fowler; Warren Light Artillery (Mississippi Battery): Lt H. Shannon

=== Longstreet's Corps ===
MG John B. Hood

Division	Brigade	Regiments and Others
Johnson's Provisional Division BG Bushrod R. Johnson	Johnson's Brigade Col John S. Fulton	17th Tennessee: Ltc Watt W. Floyd; 23rd Tennessee: Col R. H. Keeble; 25th Tennessee: Ltc R. B. Snowden; 44th Tennessee: Ltc John L. McEwen, Jr., Maj G. M. Crawford; Company E, 9th Georgia Artillery Battalion: Lt William S. Everett
Johnson's Provisional Division BG Bushrod R. Johnson	Gregg's Brigade BG John Gregg	3rd Tennessee: Col Calvin H. Walker; 10th Tennessee: Col William Grace; 30th Tennessee: Ltc James J. Turner, Cpt Charles S. Douglass; 41st Tennessee: Ltc James D. Tillman; 50th Tennessee: Col Cyrus A. Sugg, Ltc Thomas W. Beaumont, Maj Christopher W. Robertson, Col Calvin H. Walker; 1st Tennessee Battalion: Maj Stephen H. Colms, Maj Christopher W. Robertson; 7th Texas: Col Hiram B. Granbury, Maj K. M. Vanzandt; Bledsoe's (Missouri) Battery: Lt R. L. Wood
Johnson's Provisional Division BG Bushrod R. Johnson	McNair's Brigade BG Evander McNair	1st Arkansas Mounted Rifles(dismounted): Col Robert W. Harper; 2nd Arkansas Mounted Rifles (dismounted): Col James A. Williamson; 25th Arkansas: Ltc Eli Hufstedler; 4th-31st-4th Arkansas Battalion (Consolidated): Maj J. A. Ross; 39th North Carolina: Col David Coleman; Culpeper's (South Carolina) Battery: Cpt James F. Culpeper
Hood's Division BG Evander M. Law	Robertson's Brigade BG Jerome B. Robertson	3rd Arkansas: Col Van H. Manning; 1st Texas: Cpt R. J. Harding; 4th Texas: Ltc John P. Bane, Cpt R. H. Bassett; 5th Texas: Maj J. C. Rogers, Cpt J. S. Cleveland, Cpt T. T. Clay
Hood's Division BG Evander M. Law	Law's Brigade Col James Sheffield	4th Alabama: Col Pinckney D. Bowles; 15th Alabama: Col William C. Oates; 44th Alabama: Col William F. Perry; 47th Alabama: Maj James M. Campbell; 48th Alabama: Ltc William M. Hardwick
Hood's Division BG Evander M. Law	Benning's Brigade BG Henry L. Benning	2nd Georgia: Ltc William S. Shepherd, Maj W. W. Charlton; 15th Georgia: Col Dudley M. Du Bose, Maj P. J. Shannon; 17th Georgia: Ltc Charles W. Matthews; 20th Georgia: Col J. D. Waddell

=== Reserve Artillery ===
Battalions	Batteries
Robertson's Battalion Maj Felix H. Robertson	Lumsden's (Alabama) Battery: Cpt Charles L. Lumsden; Havis' (Georgia) Battery: Cpt Minor W. Havis; Massenburg's (Georgia) Battery: Cpt T. L. Massenburg; Le Gardeur's (Louisiana) Battery: Cpt G. Le Gardeur, Jr.; Barret's (Missouri) Battery: Cpt Overton W. Barret

=== Wheeler's Cavalry Corps ===
MG Joseph Wheeler

Division	Brigade	Regiments and Others
Wharton's Division BG John A. Wharton	1st Brigade Col Charles C. Crews	Malone's (Alabama) Regiment: Col J. C. Malone, Jr.; 2nd Georgia: Ltc F. M. Ison; 3rd Georgia: Col R. Thompson; 4th Georgia: Col Isaac W. Avery
Wharton's Division BG John A. Wharton	2nd Brigade Col Thomas Harrison	3rd Confederate: Col W. N. Estes; 3rd Kentucky: Ltc J. W. Griffith; 4th Tennessee: Ltc Paul F. Anderson; 8th Texas: Ltc Gustave Cook; 11th Texas: Col George R. Reeves; White's (Tennessee) Battery: Cpt B. F. White, Jr.
Martin's Division BG William T. Martin	1st Brigade Col John T. Morgan	1st Alabama: Ltc D. T. Blakey; 3rd Alabama: Ltc T. H. Mauldin; 51st Alabama: Ltc M. L. Kirkpatrick; 8th Confederate: Ltc John S. Prather
Martin's Division BG William T. Martin	2nd Brigade Col Alfred A. Russell	4th Alabama (Russell's Regiment): Ltc J. M. Hambrick; 1st Confederate: Cpt C. H. Conner; Wiggins' (2nd Arkansas) Battery: Lt J.P. Bryant

=== Forrest's Cavalry Corps ===
BG Nathan B. Forrest

Escort:

- Jackson's Company, Tennessee Cavalry: Cpt J. C. Jackson (Corps headquarters)

Division	Brigade	Regiments and Others
Armstrong's Division BG Frank C. Armstrong	Armstrong's Brigade Col James T. Wheeler	3rd Arkansas: Col A. W. Hobson; 2nd Kentucky: Ltc Thomas G. Woodward; 6th Tennessee: Ltc James H. Lewis; 18th Tennessee Battalion: Maj Charles McDonald
Armstrong's Division BG Frank C. Armstrong	Forrest's Brigade Col George G. Dibrell	4th Tennessee: Col. William S. McLemore; 8th Tennessee: Cpt Hamilton McGinnis; 9th Tennessee: Col Jacob B. Biffle; 10th Tennessee: Col Nicholas Nickleby Cox; 11th Tennessee: Col Daniel Wilson Holman; Shaw's Battalion, O. P. Hamilton's Battalion, and R. D. Allison's Squadron (consolidated): Maj Joseph Shaw; Huggins' (Tennessee) Battery: Cpt A. L. Huggins; Morton's (Tennessee) Battery: Cpt John W. Morton, Jr.
Pegram's Division BG John Pegram	Davidson's Brigade BG Henry B. Davidson	1st Georgia: Col J. J. Morrison; 6th Georgia: Col John R. Hart; 6th North Carolina: Col George N. Folk; Rucker's Tennessee Legion: Col Edmund W. Rucker; 12th Tennessee Battalion: Maj G. W. Day; 16th Tennessee Battalion: Cpt John Q. Arnold; 10th Confederate: Col C. T. Goode (detached from Scott's Brigade); Huwald's (Tennessee) Battery: Cpt Gustave A. Huwald
Pegram's Division BG John Pegram	Scott's Brigade Col John S. Scott	Detachment of John H. Morgan's command: Ltc R. M. Martin; 1st Louisiana: Ltc James O. Nixon; 2nd Tennessee: Col Henry M. Ashby; 5th Tennessee: Col George W. McKenzie; Robinson's (Louisiana) Battery (one section): Lt Winslow Robinson

== Army of Tennessee (September 20, 1863) ==
Gen Braxton Bragg, Commanding

Escort: Cpt Guy Dreux

- Dreux's Company, Louisiana Cavalry: Lt O. De Buis
- Holloway's Company, Alabama Cavalry: Cpt E. M. Holloway

=== Right Wing ===
LTG Leonidas Polk

Escort:

- Greenleaf's Company, Louisiana Cavalry: Cpt Leeds Greenleaf

==== Cheatham's Division ====
Escort:

- Company G, 2nd Georgia Cavalry: Cpt Thomas M. Merritt

Division	Brigade	Regiments and Others
Cheatham's Division MG Benjamin F. Cheatham	Jackson's Brigade BG John K. Jackson	2nd Battalion, 1st Georgia: Maj James C. Gordon; 5th Georgia: Col Charles P. Daniel; 2nd Georgia Battalion Sharpshooters: Maj Richard H. Whiteley; 5th Mississippi: Ltc W. L. Sykes, Maj John B. Herring; 8th Mississippi: Col John C. Wilkinson
Cheatham's Division MG Benjamin F. Cheatham	Smith's Brigade Col Alfred J. Vaughan, Jr.	11th Tennessee: Col George W. Gordon; 12th-47th Tennessee Col William M. Watkins; 13th-154th Tennessee: Col A. J. Vaughan, Ltc R.W. Pitman; 29th Tennessee: Col Horace Rice; Dawson's Battalion Sharpshooters: Maj J.W. Dawson, Maj William Green, Maj James Purl
Cheatham's Division MG Benjamin F. Cheatham	Maney's Brigade BG George Maney	1st-27th Tennessee: Col Hume R. Field; 4th Tennessee (Provisional Army): Col James A. McMurry, Ltc Robert N. Lewis, Maj Oliver A. Bradshaw, Cpt Joseph Bostick; 6th-9th Tennessee: Col George C. Porter; 24th Tennessee Battalion Sharpshooters: Maj Frank Maney
Cheatham's Division MG Benjamin F. Cheatham	Wright's Brigade BG Marcus J. Wright	8th Tennessee: Col John H. Anderson; 16th Tennessee: Col D. M. Donnell; 28th Tennessee: Col Sidney S. Stanton; 38th Tennessee: Col John C. Carter; 51st-52nd Tennessee: Ltc John G. Hall; 22nd Tennessee Battalion: Maj Thomas B. Murray
Cheatham's Division MG Benjamin F. Cheatham	Strahl's Brigade BG Otho F. Strahl	4th-5th Tennessee: Col Jonathan J. Lamb; 19th Tennessee: Col Francis M. Walker; 24th Tennessee: Col John A. Wilson; 31st Tennessee: Col Egbert E. Tansil; 33rd Tennessee: Col Warner P. Jones
Cheatham's Division MG Benjamin F. Cheatham	Artillery Maj Melancthon Smith	Carnes' (Tennessee) Battery: Cpt William W. Carnes; Scogin's (Georgia) Battery: Cpt John Scogin; Scott's (Tennessee) Battery: Lt John H. Marsh, Lt A. T. Watson, Cpt William L. Scott; Smith's (Mississippi) Battery: Lt William B. Turner; Stanford's (Mississippi) Battery: Cpt Thomas J. Stanford

==== Hill's Corps ====
LTG Daniel H. Hill

Escort:

- Sanders' Company Tennessee Cavalry: Cpt C. F. Sanders (Cleburne's Division)
- Foules' Company, Mississippi Cavalry: Cpt H. L. Foules (Breckinridge's Division)

Division	Brigade	Regiments and Others
Cleburne's Division MG Patrick Cleburne	Wood's Brigade BG Sterling A. M. Wood	16th Alabama: Maj John H. McGaughy, Cpt Frederick A. Ashford; 33rd Alabama: Col Samuel Adams; 45th Alabama: Col E. B. Breedlove; Gibson's (18th) Alabama Battalion: Maj John H. Gibson (mw) (attached to 33rd Alabama); 32nd-45th Mississippi: Col Mark P. Lowrey; 15th Mississippi Battalion Sharpshooters: Maj A. T. Hawkins, Cpt Daniel Coleman
Cleburne's Division MG Patrick Cleburne	Polk's Brigade BG Lucius E. Polk	1st Arkansas: Col John W. Colquitt; 3rd-5th Confederate: Col James A. Smith; 2nd Tennessee: Col William D. Robison; 35th Tennessee: Col Benjamin J. Hill; 48th Tennessee: Col George H. Nixon
Cleburne's Division MG Patrick Cleburne	Deshler's Brigade BG James Deshler (k); Col Roger Q. Mills	19th-24th Arkansas: Ltc A. S. Hutchison; 6th-10th Texas-15th Texas Cavalry (dismounted): Col Roger Q. Mills, Ltc T. Scott Anderson; 17th-18th-24th-25th Texas Cavalry (dismounted): Col F. C. Wilkes, Ltc John T. Coit, Maj William A. Taylor
Cleburne's Division MG Patrick Cleburne	Artillery Cpt Henry C. Semple	Calvert's (Arkansas) Battery: Lt Thomas J. Key; Douglas's Texas Battery: Cpt James P. Douglas; Semple's (Alabama) Battery: Lt R. W. Goldthwaite
Breckinridge's Division MG John C. Breckinridge
Breckinridge's Division MG John C. Breckinridge	Helm's Brigade BG Benjamin Helm (k); Col Joseph H. Lewis	41st Alabama: Col Martin L. Stansel; 2nd Kentucky: Ltc James W. Hewitt, Ltc James W. Moss; 4th Kentucky: Col Joseph P. Nuckols, Maj Thomas W. Thompson; 6th Kentucky: Col Joseph H. Lewis, Ltc Martin H. Cofer; 9th Kentucky: Col John W. Caldwell, Ltc John C. Wickliffe
Breckinridge's Division MG John C. Breckinridge	Adams' Brigade BG Daniel W. Adams (w & c); Col Randall L. Gibson	32nd Alabama: Maj John C. Kimbell, Col Randall L. Gibson; 13th-20th Louisiana: Col Leon von Zinken, Cpt E. M. Dubroca; 16th-25th Louisiana: Col Daniel Gober; 19th Louisiana: Ltc Richard W. Turner, Maj Loudon Butler, Cpt H. A. Kennedy; 14th Louisiana Battalion: Maj J. E. Austin
Breckinridge's Division MG John C. Breckinridge	Stovall's Brigade BG Marcellus A. Stovall	1st-3rd Florida: Col William S. Dilworth; 4th Florida: Col W. L. L. Bowen; 47th Georgia: Cpt William S. Phillips, Cpt Joseph S. Cone; 60th North Carolina: Ltc James M. Ray, Cpt James Thomas Weaver
Breckinridge's Division MG John C. Breckinridge	Artillery Maj Rice E. Graves (mw)	Cobb's (Kentucky) Battery: Cpt Robert Cobb; Graves' (Kentucky) Battery: Lt S. M. Spencer; Mebane's (Tennessee) Battery: Cpt John W. Mebane; Slocomb's (Louisiana) Battery: Cpt C. H. Slocomb

==== Reserve Corps ====
MG William H. T. Walker

Division	Brigade	Regiments and Others
Walker's Division BG States R. Gist	Gist's Brigade Col Peyton H. Colquitt (k); Ltc Leroy Napier	46th Georgia: Maj A. M. Speer; 8th Georgia Battalion: Ltc Leroy Napier, Maj Z. L. Watters; 24th South Carolina: Col Clement H. Stevens (w), Ltc Ellison Capers
Walker's Division BG States R. Gist	Ector's Brigade BG Matthew D. Ector	Stone's (Alabama) Battalion Sharpshooters: Maj T. O. Stone; Pound's (Mississippi) Battalion Sharpshooters: Cpt M. Pound; 29th North Carolina: Col William B. Creasman; 9th Texas: Col William Hugh Young (w); 10th Texas Cavalry (dismounted): Ltc C. R. Earp; 14th Texas Cavalry (dismounted): Col J. L. Camp; 32nd Texas Cavalry (dismounted): Col Julius A. Andrews
Walker's Division BG States R. Gist	Wilson's Brigade Col Claudius C. Wilson	25th Georgia: Ltc A. J. Williams; 29th Georgia: Ltc George R. McRae; 30th Georgia: Ltc James S. Bonton; 1st Georgia Battalion Sharpshooters: Maj Arthur Shaaff; 4th Louisiana Battalion: Ltc John McEnery
Walker's Division BG States R. Gist	Artillery	Howell's (Georgia) Battery: Cpt Evan Howell
Liddell's Division BG St. John R. Liddell	Liddell's Brigade Col Daniel C. Govan	2nd-15th Arkansas: Ltc Reuben F. Harvey, Cpt A. T. Meek; 5th-13th Arkansas: Col L. Featherston (k), Ltc John E. Murray; 6th-7th Arkansas: Col D. A. Gillespie, Ltc Peter Snyder; 8th Arkansas: Ltc George F. Baucum, Maj A. Watkins; 1st Louisiana (Regulars) (attached to 8th Arkansas)
Liddell's Division BG St. John R. Liddell	Walthall's Brigade BG Edward C. Walthall	24th Mississippi: Ltc R. P. McKelvaine, Maj W. C. Staples, Cpt B. F. Toomer, Cpt J. D. Smith; 27th Mississippi: Col James A. Campbell; 29th Mississippi: Col William F. Brantley; 30th Mississippi: Col Junius I. Scales, Maj James M. Johnson; 34th Mississippi: Ltc Hugh A. Reynolds (mw)
Liddell's Division BG St. John R. Liddell	Artillery Cpt Charles Swett	Fowler's (Alabama) Battery: Cpt William H. Fowler; Warren Light Artillery (Mississippi Battery): Lt H. Shannon

=== Left Wing ===
LTG James Longstreet

==== Hindman's Division ====
Escort:

- Lenoir's Company, Alabama Cavalry: Cpt T.M. Lenoir

Division	Brigade	Regiments and Others
Hindman's Division MG Thomas C. Hindman (w); BG Patton Anderson	Anderson's Brigade BG Patton Anderson; Col Jacob H. Sharp	7th Mississippi: Col W. H. Bishop; 9th Mississippi: Maj T. H. Lynam; 10th Mississippi: Ltc James Barr; 41st Mississippi: Col. W. F. Tucker; 44th Mississippi: Col J. H. Sharp, Ltc R. G. Kelsey; 9th Mississippi Battalion Sharpshooters: Maj W. C. Richards; Garrity's (Alabama) Battery: Cpt James Garrity
Hindman's Division MG Thomas C. Hindman (w); BG Patton Anderson	Deas' Brigade BG Zach C. Deas	19th Alabama: Col Samuel K. McSpadden; 22nd Alabama: Ltc John Weedon, Cpt Harry T. Toulmin; 25th Alabama: Col George D. Johnston; 39th Alabama: Col Whitfield Clark; 50th Alabama: Col John G. Coltart; 17th Alabama Battalion Sharpshooters: Cpt James F. Nabers; Dent's (Alabama) Battery: Cpt S. H. Dent
Hindman's Division MG Thomas C. Hindman (w); BG Patton Anderson	Manigault's Brigade BG Arthur M. Manigault	24th Alabama: Col N. N. Davis; 28th Alabama: Col John C. Reid; 34th Alabama: Maj John N. Slaughter; 10th-19th South Carolina: Col James F. Pressley; Waters' (Alabama) Battery: Lt Charles W. Watkins

==== Buckner's Corps ====
MG Simon Bolivar Buckner, Sr.

Escort:

- Clark's Company, Tennessee Cavalry: Cpt J. W. Clark (Corps headquarters)

Division	Brigade	Regiments and Others
Stewart's Division MG Alexander P. Stewart	Bate's Brigade BG William B. Bate	58th Alabama: Col Bushrod Jones; 37th Georgia: Col A. F. Rudler, Ltc Joseph T. Smith; 4th Georgia Battalion Sharpshooters: Maj T. D. Caswell, Cpt B. M. Turner, Lt Joel Towers; 15th-37th Tennessee: Col Robert C. Tyler, Ltc R. Dudley Frayser, Cpt R. M. Tankesley; 20th Tennessee: Col Thomas B. Smith, Maj W. M. Shy
Stewart's Division MG Alexander P. Stewart	Brown's Brigade BG John C. Brown (w); Col Edmund C. Cook	18th Tennessee: Col Joseph B. Palmer (w), Ltc William R. Butler, Cpt Gideon H. Lowe; 26th Tennessee: Col John M. Lillard, Maj Richard M. Saffell; 32nd Tennessee: Col Edmund C. Cook, Cpt Calaway G. Tucker; 45th Tennessee: Col Anderson Searcy; 23rd Tennessee Battalion: Maj Tazewell W. Newman, Cpt W. P. Simpson
Stewart's Division MG Alexander P. Stewart	Clayton's Brigade BG Henry De Lamar Clayton, Sr.	18th Alabama: Col James T. Holtzclaw, Ltc R. F. Inge, Maj P. F. Hunley; 36th Alabama: Col Lewis T. Woodruff; 38th Alabama: Ltc A. R. Lankford
Stewart's Division MG Alexander P. Stewart	Artillery Maj John W. Eldridge	1st Arkansas Battery: Cpt John T. Humphreys; T. H. Dawson's (Georgia) Battery: Lt R. W. Anderson; Eufaula Artillery (Alabama Battery): Cpt McDonald Oliver
Preston's Division BG William Preston	Gracie's Brigade BG Archibald Gracie, Jr.	43rd Alabama: Col Young M. Moody; 1st Battalion, Hilliard's Alabama Legion: Ltc John H. Holt, Cpt George W. Huguley; 2nd Battalion, Hilliard's Alabama Legion: Ltc Bolling Hall, Jr., Cpt W. D. Walden; 3rd Battalion, Hilliard's Alabama Legion: Ltc John W. A. Sanford; 4th Battalion, Hilliard's Alabama Legion: Maj John D. McLennan; 63rd Tennessee: Ltc Abraham Fulkerson, Maj John A. Aiken
Preston's Division BG William Preston	3rd Brigade Col John H. Kelly	65th Georgia: Col R. H. Moore; 5th Kentucky: Col Hiram Hawkins; 58th North Carolina: Col John B. Palmer; 63rd Virginia: Maj James M. French
Preston's Division BG William Preston	Trigg's Brigade Col Robert C. Trigg	1st Florida Cavalry (dismounted): Col G. Troup Maxwell; 6th Florida: Col J. J. Finley; 7th Florida: Col Robert Bullock; 54th Virginia: Ltc John J. Wade
Preston's Division BG William Preston	9th Georgia Artillery Battalion Maj William A. Leyden	Company C: Cpt Andrew M. Wolihin; Company D: Cpt Tyler M. Peeples; Jeffress' (Virginia) Battery: Cpt William C. Jeffress
	Corps Reserve Artillery Maj Samuel C. Williams	Kolb's (Alabama) Battery: Cpt R. F. Kolb; McCants' (Florida) Battery: Cpt Robert P. McCants; Darden's (Mississippi) Battery: Cpt Putnam Darden; Baxter's (Tennessee) Battery: Cpt Edmund D. Baxter

==== Longstreet's Corps ====
MG John B. Hood (w)

Division	Brigade	Regiments and Others
Johnson's Provisional Division BG Bushrod R. Johnson	Johnson's Brigade Col John S. Fulton	17th Tennessee: Ltc Watt W. Floyd; 23rd Tennessee: Col R. H. Keeble; 25th Tennessee: Ltc R. B. Snowden; 44th Tennessee: Ltc John L. McEwen, Jr., Maj G. M. Crawford; Company E, 9th Georgia Artillery Battalion: Lt William S. Everett
Johnson's Provisional Division BG Bushrod R. Johnson	Gregg's Brigade BG John Gregg (w); Col Cyrus A. Sugg	3rd Tennessee: Col Calvin H. Walker; 10th Tennessee: Col William Grace; 30th Tennessee: Ltc James J. Turner, Cpt Charles S. Douglass; 41st Tennessee: Ltc James D. Tillman; 50th Tennessee: Col Cyrus A. Sugg, Ltc Thomas W. Beaumont, Maj Christopher W. Robertson, Col Calvin H. Walker; 1st Tennessee Battalion: Maj Stephen H. Colms, Maj Christopher W. Robertson; 7th Texas: Col Hiram B. Granbury, Maj K. M. Vanzandt; Bledsoe's (Missouri) Battery: Lt R. L. Wood
Johnson's Provisional Division BG Bushrod R. Johnson	McNair's Brigade BG Evander McNair (w); Col David Coleman	1st Arkansas Mounted Rifles (dismounted): Col Robert W. Harper; 2nd Arkansas Mounted Rifles (dismounted): Col James A. Williamson; 25th Arkansas: Ltc Eli Hufstedler; 4th-31st Arkansas-4th Arkansas Battalion: Maj J. A. Ross; 39th North Carolina: Col David Coleman; Culpeper's (South Carolina) Battery: Cpt James F. Culpeper
Hood's Division BG Evander M. Law	Robertson's Brigade BG Jerome B. Robertson	3rd Arkansas: Col Van H. Manning; 1st Texas: Cpt R. J. Harding; 4th Texas: Ltc John P. Bane, Cpt R. H. Bassett; 5th Texas: Maj J. C. Rogers, Cpt J. S. Cleveland, Cpt T. T. Clay
Hood's Division BG Evander M. Law	Law's Brigade Col James Sheffield	4th Alabama: Col Pinckney D. Bowles; 15th Alabama: Col William C. Oates; 44th Alabama: Col William F. Perry; 47th Alabama: Maj James M. Campbell; 48th Alabama: Ltc William M. Hardwick
Hood's Division BG Evander M. Law	Benning's Brigade BG Henry L. Benning	2nd Georgia: Ltc William S. Shepherd, Maj W. W. Charlton; 15th Georgia: Col Dudley M. Du Bose, Maj P. J. Shannon; 17th Georgia: Ltc Charles W. Matthews; 20th Georgia: Col J. D. Waddell
McLaws' Division BG Joseph B. Kershaw	Kershaw's Brigade BG Joseph B. Kershaw	2nd South Carolina: Ltc Franklin Gaillard; 3rd South Carolina: Col James D. Nance; 7th South Carolina: Ltc Elbert Bland (k), Maj John S. Hard (k), Cpt E. J. Goggans; 8th South Carolina: Col John W. Henagan; 15th South Carolina: Col Joseph F. Gist; 3rd South Carolina Battalion: Cpt Joshua M. Townsend (k)
McLaws' Division BG Joseph B. Kershaw	Humphreys' Brigade BG Benjamin G. Humphreys	13th Mississippi: Ltc Kennon McElroy; 17th Mississippi: Ltc John C. Fiser; 18th Mississippi: Cpt W. F. Hubbard; 21st Mississippi: Ltc D. N. Moody

==== Reserve Artillery ====
Battalions	Batteries
Robertson's Battalion Maj Felix H. Robertson	Lumsden's (Alabama) Battery: Cpt Charles L. Lumsden; Havis' (Georgia) Battery: Cpt Minor W. Havis; Massenburg's (Georgia) Battery: Cpt T. L. Massenburg; Le Gardeur's (Louisiana) Battery: Cpt G. Le Gardeur, Jr.; Barret's (Missouri) Battery: Cpt Overton W. Barret

=== Cavalry ===
==== Wheeler's Corps ====
MG Joseph Wheeler

Division	Brigade	Regiments and Others
Wharton's Division BG John A. Wharton	1st Brigade Col Charles C. Crews	Malone's (Alabama) Regiment: Col J. C. Malone, Jr.; 2nd Georgia: Ltc F. M. Ison; 3rd Georgia: Col R. Thompson; 4th Georgia: Col Isaac W. Avery
Wharton's Division BG John A. Wharton	2nd Brigade Col Thomas Harrison	3rd Confederate: Col W. N. Estes; 3rd Kentucky: Ltc J. W. Griffith; 4th Tennessee: Ltc Paul F. Anderson; 8th Texas: Ltc Gustave Cook; 11th Texas: Col G. R. Reeves; White's (Tennessee) Battery: Cpt B. F. White, Jr.
Martin's Division BG William T. Martin	1st Brigade Col John T. Morgan	1st Alabama: Ltc D. T. Blakey; 3rd Alabama: Ltc T. H. Mauldin; 51st Alabama: Ltc M. L. Kirkpatrick; 8th Confederate: Ltc John S. Prather
Martin's Division BG William T. Martin	2nd Brigade Col Alfred A. Russell	4th Alabama (Russell's Regiment): Ltc J. M. Hambrick; 1st Confederate: Cpt C. H. Conner; Wiggins' (2nd Arkansas) Battery: Lt J.P. Bryant

==== Forrest's Cavalry Corps ====
BG Nathan B. Forrest

Escort:

- Jackson's Company, Tennessee Cavalry: Cpt J. C. Jackson (Corps headquarters)

Division	Brigade	Regiments and Others
Armstrong's Division BG Frank C. Armstrong	Armstrong's Brigade Col James T. Wheeler	3rd Arkansas: Col A. W. Hobson; 2nd Kentucky: Ltc Thomas G. Woodward; 6th Tennessee: Ltc James H. Lewis; 18th Tennessee Battalion: Maj Charles McDonald
Armstrong's Division BG Frank C. Armstrong	Forrest's Brigade Col George G. Dibrell	4th Tennessee: Col. William S. McLemore; 8th Tennessee: Cpt Hamilton McGinnis; 9th Tennessee: Col Jacob B. Biffle; 10th Tennessee: Col Nicholas Nickleby Cox; 11th Tennessee: Col Daniel Wilson Holman; Shaw's Battalion, O. P. Hamilton's Battalion, and R. D. Allison's Squadron (consolidated): Maj Joseph Shaw; Huggins' (Tennessee) Battery: Cpt A. L. Huggins; Morton's (Tennessee) Battery: Cpt John W. Morton, Jr.
Pegram's Division BG John Pegram	Davidson's Brigade BG Henry B. Davidson	1st Georgia: Col J. J. Morrison; 6th Georgia: Col John R. Hart; 6th North Carolina: Col George N. Folk; Rucker's Tennessee Legion: Col Edmund W. Rucker; 12th Tennessee Battalion: Maj G. W. Day; 16th Tennessee Battalion: Cpt John Q. Arnold; 10th Confederate: Col C. T. Goode (w)(detached from Scott's Brigade); Huwald's (Tennessee) Battery: Cpt Gustave A. Huwald
Pegram's Division BG John Pegram	Scott's Brigade Col John S. Scott	Detachment of John H. Morgan's command: Ltc R. M. Martin; 1st Louisiana: Ltc James O. Nixon; 2nd Tennessee: Col H. M. Ashby; 5th Tennessee: Col George W. McKenzie; Robinson's (Louisiana) Battery (one section): Lt Winslow Robinson
