= Second Corps, Army of Tennessee =

Confederate Army unit

- Battle Flag under Bragg (left); Battle Flag under Breckinridge (right)
- Active: April 1862 – April 26, 1865
- Country: Confederate States of America
- Allegiance: Tennessee
- Branch: Confederate States Army
- Type: Army Corps
- Role: Infantry
- Size: 2-4 divisions
- Part of: Army of Tennessee
- Engagements: American Civil War

Commanders
- Notable commanders: Maj. Gen. Braxton Bragg; Lt. Gen. William J. Hardee; Maj. Gen. John C. Breckinridge; Lt. Gen. John Bell Hood; Lt. Gen. S.D. Lee; Lt. Gen. A.P. Stewart; Maj. Gen. Edward Johnson; Lt. Gen. D.H. Hill

The Second Corps, Army of Tennessee was a military formation in the Confederate Army during the American Civil War.

== Formation ==
The Corps was originally formed before the Battle of Shiloh in April 1862 by combining Daniel Ruggles' Alabama Division and Braxton Bragg's Army of Pensacola. The Corps was forming in Corinth, Mississippi, when it was made the II Corps, Army of the Mississippi. It contained two divisions; the first one was under Jones Withers and the second was under Daniel Ruggles. The II Corps numbered 22,000 men, making it the largest in the Confederate Army, and was placed under command of Braxton Bragg.

At its first battle (Shiloh), the Corps initially drove Benjamin Prentiss's Union division from their camps. But when Prentiss, W. H. L. Wallace and their divisions dug in at the Hornet's Nest, Bragg assaulted the position from all sides for hours without dislodging them. Suffering heavily, the Second Corps was completely disorganized by the time they forced Prentiss out and was held in reserve for the rest of the battle, briefly fighting on the second day.

With many line officers killed or wounded, the Corps took months to refit. Fighting in the Corinth Campaign, the Corps was later re-organized for its next operation in September 1862, the invasion of Kentucky.

== Service and reorganization ==
The II Corps after Corinth was again reorganized with two divisions, the first under Patton Anderson and the second under Simon Buckner. The Corps was now led by William Hardee, and Braxton Bragg was promoted to army command. The Corps was only lightly engaged at Perryville, however, and the entire Army wasn't even present.

The Corps and the entire Army were re-organized again. John Breckinridge and his division, who had fought at Shiloh but were absent at Perryville, were now attached. Numbering 11,000 men, his division boosted the strength of the corps by 40%. Anderson's division was dispersed between Buckner and the I Corps, but to replace him was a division from Kirby Smith's Army under John McCown. Buckner was sent to Knoxville, but his division was then placed under the brilliant commander Patrick Cleburne. The Corps all in all numbered approximately 25,000 men; McCown's division had 5,000, Breckinridge had 11,000 and Cleburne had 9,000.

== Stones River and middle Tennessee ==
After the reorganization in the fall of 1862, the Army of Tennessee was ready for action, as was the Second Corps. This action took place at Murfreesboro, in the Battle of Stones River. The battle began when William Rosecrans and his Army of the Cumberland marched south from Nashville against Bragg at Murfreesboro. Bragg ordered an assault on the Union right flank, where George Thomas and Alexander McCook's corps were stationed. In a pre-dawn assault similar to Shiloh, Hardee's Corps was the spearhead when McCown's division attacked at 5:30 am. His attack, as well as Cleburne's, threw the entire Union force in flight, pushing both corps back over a mile. Weary and exhausted, they stopped as Polk and his Corps were to finish the job. Leonidas Polk mismanaged his assaults, and all Confederate gains by the II Corps were squandered and not exploited. Eventually, it fell to the II Corps to do the work again, and they eventually drove Phil Sheridan's division, who kept Polk stopped all afternoon. The battle otherwise was a Confederate success so far, mainly due to Hardee and the II corps. The next two days decided the final outcome.

Rather than following up on victory, Braxton Bragg waited a day, then on January 2 attacked Rosecrans with the reserve of the army, Breckinridge's division from the II corps. Breckinridge was ordered to assault the Union left, Thomas Crittenden's Corps over open ground and a river. Breckinridge, Hardee, Cleburne and the other officers protested, but Bragg didn't listen. Breckinridge drove the first Union division at the river in a suicidal charge, but was bloodied once he attacked the main line. Bragg retreated the next day, with the II Corps as the rear guard.

== Chickamauga-Chattanooga ==
The Corps was reorganized yet again after Stones River. Alexander P. Stewart and his division of 6,000 were attached to the II Corps, but Breckinridge and his division were sent to help the Siege of Vicksburg. The Confederate Army was idle for the next few months, until Breckinridge returned. When he did, due to arguments with Bragg, Hardee and McCown were relieved and the Corps was again reorganized. Daniel Harvey Hill was sent from the Army of Northern Virginia to take command. The Corps was re-organized with divisions under Stewart, Cleburne and Breckinridge, all in all 20,000 men. McCown's old division was now placed under St. John Liddell, and moved to the reserve Corps under William H.T. Walker.

After campaigning for a few months in Tennessee, Bragg was driven out to Chattanooga, and then lost that city. In north Georgia, however, he re-formed for a counterstrike. Troops from Mississippi came under Walker and Nathan B. Forrest, soldiers from east Tennessee under Buckner, troops from Georgia, Kentucky, east Tennessee and Mississippi under Bushrod Johnson and troops from Virginia under James Longstreet.

The army was again re-organized; Hill lost Stewart's division, which was sent to Buckner's Corps, but he still had Cleburne and Breckinridge. The corps was heavily engaged at Chickamauga, assaulting the Union left. After the Confederates broke through on the left, the II Corps did the same on the right, securing the Confederate victory. The Corps suffered heavily in the battle however, and was exhausted. Hill, as well as many other officers, wished to pursue the broken enemy, but Bragg declined and in turn relieved Hill, Polk, Walker, Forrest and other officers from command.

At Chattanooga, the Corps was re-organized. Breckinridge took command of the Corps with his old division under William B. Bate, Cleburne's division though, the pride of the II Corps, was transferred to the I Corps. Buckner's division from his old Corps was sent to the II only to be transferred up to Knoxville with James Longstreet. Thomas Hindman's division was transferred to the II from the I, and lastly, on a brighter note, Stewart and his division were returned to the II from Buckner's old corps. All in all between Bate, Stewart, Buckner and Hindman, the Corps numbered close to 28,000 men. Once Buckner left it was down to 23,000 men.

At the battle itself, the II Corps was stationed in the center on Missionary Ridge as well as Orchard Knob in a salient. When Orchard Knob was taken, the Union force under George Thomas attacked the center and broke the II Corps, sending them fleeing in confusion. But with light casualties on both sides, the battle didn't inflict much damage, other than damaging Confederate morale.

== Atlanta ==
The Corps was reorganized again in December when Joseph Johnston took command from the incompetent Braxton Bragg. Although he had nothing to be blamed for at Chattanooga, John Breckinridge was relieved of command and replaced by John Bell Hood; who had come from the east with Longstreet's Corps. The corps was the same as it was at Chattanooga, except that Bate and his division were traded in for Carter Stevenson's division of the I corps. By that time, none of the units originally in the II were still in it.

The corps fought in all the engagements of the campaign, and at Resaca and New Hope Church they played key roles. At Kennesaw Mountain, its soldiers disobeyed orders to attack the flanking columns of John Schofield's Army of the Ohio and drove them back in a decisive manner.

Once Hood took command of the Army, there was another reorganization. Stewart took command, but was transferred to the III Corps, then Stevenson took command, then Cheatham, then Stewart again, then Hindman, and finally Stephen D. Lee. All of these changes took place within a time span of three months. The Corps was heavily engaged at Atlanta and at Ezra Church, where they suffered heavy losses.

== Invasion of Tennessee ==
After Atlanta fell to William T. Sherman, Hood went north with his army, but made a few changes. In the II corps, easterner S.D. Lee was still in command, but his division commanders were different. Stevenson was at his usual post, but H.D. Clayton took over Stewart's division, the latter taking command of the III Corps. Hindman was relieved and in his place was a newly exchanged former prison-of-war, Edward Johnson, an easterner.

The Corps marched north into Tennessee, but missed the bloodbath at Franklin, and cost Hood the battle. Like d'Erlon's I Corps at Ligny and Quatre Bras in the Waterloo campaign, the Corps never advanced on Schofield's rear by seizing his line of retreat on the Cumberland. Thus, for the first time in its history, the II Corps cost their commander the battle. At Nashville, however, the Corps took the center when they were assaulted by an old nemesis, George Thomas. They were pushed back, and the II corps then was transferred to the right flank. The starving Confederates fled without much defense, and cost Hood another battle.

== In the Carolinas ==
After Nashville in the early spring of 1865, the Confederate Army was discouraged; there was no hope for the cause. Hood resigned, and the Army went to Joseph Johnston again. The corps was re-organized again, with Stevenson, Clayton and M.A. Stovall in command of the divisions, and Johnson had been captured once again. The remnants of the Army were transferred to stop Sherman in the Carolinas. In this campaign the corps was commanded by D. H. Hill again. At Bentonville, the Confederates were to assault an isolated Union force under Slocum, and the II Corps was to lead the spearhead in a flank attack. As a result of the overwhelming Union strength and the heavy casualties his army suffered in the battle, Johnston surrendered to Sherman little more than a month later at Bennett Place, near Durham Station. Coupled with Gen. Robert E. Lee's surrender on April 9, Johnston's surrender represented the effective end of the war.

== Bibliography ==
- Hughes, Nathaniel Cheairs, Jr. Bentonville: The Final Battle of Sherman and Johnston. Chapel Hill: University of North Carolina Press, 1996. ISBN 0-8078-2281-7.
- Bradley, Mark L. Last Stand in the Carolinas: The Battle of Bentonville. Campbell, California: Savas Publishing Co., 1995. ISBN 1-882810-02-3.
