= 10th South Carolina Infantry Regiment =

10th South Carolina Infantry Regiment Walker's Battalion, South Carolina Infantry
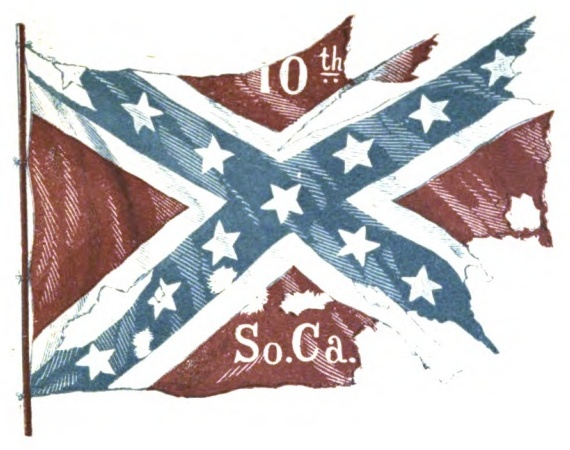
- Battle Flag of the 10th South Carolina Infantry
- Active: May 31, 1861 – April 26, 1865
- Country: Confederate States of America
- Allegiance: South Carolina
- Branch: Confederate States Army
- Type: Regiment; Battalion (since April 9, 1865)
- Role: Infantry
- Size: 1,200 men (at full strength); 2189 men (total)
- Part of: Trapier's Bde / Withers' Div / II Corps; Manigault's Bde / Withers' Div / Polk's Corps; Manigault's Bde / Hindman's Div / Polk's Corps; Manigault's Bde / Hindman's Div / Hood's Corps; Manigault's Bde / Brown's Div / Lee's Corps; Manigault's Bde / Johnson's Div / Lee's Corps; Sharp's Bde / D.H. Hill's Div / Lee's Corps
- Nicknames: "Bloody Tenth", "Old Tenth"
- Armament: Lorenz rifle Pattern 1853 Enfield
- Engagements: American Civil War: Siege of Corinth; Battle of Farmington; Confederate Heartland Offensive; Battle of Munfordville; Battle of Murfreesboro; Tullahoma Campaign; Chickamauga Campaign; Battle of Chickamauga; Chattanooga campaign; Battle of Missionary Ridge; Atlanta campaign; Battle of Resaca; Battle of Dallas; Battle of New Hope Church; Battle of Kennesaw Mountain; Battle of Peachtree Creek; Battle of Atlanta; Battle of Jonesborough; Battle of Lovejoy's Station; Franklin-Nashville Campaign; Battle of Franklin; Battle of Nashville; Carolinas campaign; Battle of Wyse Fork; Battle of Bentonville

Commanders
- Notable commanders: Col. Arthur M. Manigault; Col. James F. Pressley; Lt. Col. C. Irvine Walker

The 10th South Carolina Infantry Regiment was a Confederate volunteer infantry unit from the state of South Carolina during the American Civil War. It fought with the Army of Tennessee in the Western Theater for the duration of the war. Originally organized to serve for twelve months it was reorganized for the war in 1862. Sent east to fight in the Carolinas Campaign in 1865 it was consolidated with the 19th South Carolina Infantry Regiment and formed Walker's Battalion, South Carolina Infantry. The unit surrendered with General Joseph E. Johnston and the Army of Tennessee at Bennett Place on April 26, 1865. Out of 2189 men listed on the regimental muster rolls throughout the conflict only 55 enlisted men remained to be paroled.

== Organization and equipment ==
=== Organization ===
The bill to organize a force for State defence passed by the Legislature of South Carolina in December, 1860, and divided the State into ten districts in each of which one regiment was to be formed. The district from which the 10th Regiment was to be formed embraced Horry, Marion, Georgetown, Williamsburg, and part of Charleston District. Assembling at Camp Marion, near Georgetown, on May 19; its organization was completed on May 31, 1861: By election the field officers were:

- Col. Arthur M. Manigault, Commanding Officer
- Lt. Col. James F. Pressley
- Maj. Richard G. White
- Capt. C. Irvine Walker, Adjutant
- Capt. B. H. Wilson, Quartermaster
- Capt. T. Nelson Britton, Commissary
- Dr. P. P. Bonneau, Surgeon
- Dr. J. P. Cain, Assistant Surgeon
- Rev. W. T. Capers, Chaplain

The original 10 companies assembled on July 19, 1861, at Camp Marion near Georgetown were:

- Company A – "The Georgetown Rifle Guards", from Georgetown, Williamsburg and Horry Counties – Capt. P.C.J. Weston
- Company B – "Brooks Guards", from Horry County – Capt. J.H. Norman
- Company C – "Lake Swamp Volunteers", form Horry County – Capt. A.H. Johnson
- Company D – "Wee Nee Volunteers", from Williamsburg County – Capt. R.M. Gourdin
- Company E – "Black Mingo Rifle Guards", from Williamsburg County – Capt. J.F. Carraway
- Company F – "Pee Dee Rangers", from Marion County – Capt. E. Miller
- Company G – "Coast Guards", from Charleston County – Capt. A.H. Du Pre
- Company H – "Liberty Volunteers", from Williamsburg County – Capt. J.H. Nettles
- Company I – "Swamp Fox Guards", from Marion County – Capt. H.N. Lofton
- Company K – "Eutaw Volunteers", from Charleston County – Capt. J.T. Porcher

When companies D and G were refused for service they were replaced until September 1861 with:

- Company D – "Marion Volunteers", from Marion County – Capt. Z. Godbold
- Company G – "Horry Rough and Ready's", from Horry County – Capt. S. Bell

In November 1861 the regiment could muster 2 more companies:

- Company L – "Liberty Guards", from Marion County – Capt. S.E. McMillian
- Company M – "Horry Dixie Boys", from Horry County – Capt. W.J. Taylor

Before the official formation of the regiment some of its companies were already active. The Georgetown Rifle Guards were stationed on South Island Redoubt while the Brooks Guards were stationed on North Island.

=== Equipment ===
The government issued uniforms to 8 of the companies, while companies A, B, E, and K uniformed themselves. Tenting and camp equipment was furnished by the government according to army regulations. Initially there were four kinds of arms in the regiment. Company A was armed with English Enfield rifles, a contribution from its captain. Company B used the M1841 Mississippi rifle. Company E sported Harper's Ferry rifled muskets and the other companies used smoothbore muskets. Over the course of war the regiment partially adopted the Austrian Lorenz rifle, and after the Battle of Franklin in November 1864 it finally unified in the use of the Enfield rifle.

== War service ==
=== 1861–1862 ===
In August the Regiment was transferred to the Confederate Government. Colonel Manigault, a veteran of the Mexican–American War, had trained, drilled and shaped his 12 companies with the assistance of the cadets from The Citadel, The Military College of South Carolina; and the regiment soon gained a reputation for its disciplined appearance. The regiment moved to the coast and was stationed at Cat Island Redoubt, located between Winyah Bay and Santee River; and went into garrison and winter quarters. While there the training continued, even with many of the men suffering from typhoid fever, measles and mumps. In March 1862 it marched to Charleston where it was reorganized and enlisted for the duration of the war. On April 12 it was sent west to join the forces of General P.G.T. Beauregard in Mississippi. Passing through Augusta, Atlanta, Montgomery and Mobile they arrived at Corinth on April 25 and 26. Initially put in a brigade under command of Gen. Donelson the regiment was soon brigaded with the 24th, 28th, and 34th Alabama Infantry, as well as with the 19th South Carolina Regiment. Under command of Brig. Gen. James H. Trapier it was part of Withers' Division of the II Corps in the Army of Mississippi. In April and May it participated in the Siege of Corinth and was used on picket and fatigue duty until the army retreated to Tupelo, Mississippi. Recuperating and reorganizing in Tupelo Col. Manigault commenced his drill and fostered his regiment's reputation.

On one occasion, at Tupelo, Miss., General Bragg having stopped, as he frequently did, to witness
the drill of the regiment, sent a staff officer to compliment it and give thanks for the pleasure the drill
had given him; the only instance of the kind occurring in that army to the knowledge of the writer.

— Walker, C. Irvine, Rolls and historical sketch of the Tenth Regiment, So. Ca. Volunteers, in the army of the Confederate States, 1881, p. 73

When Gen. Trapier was relieved of his command by Gen. Bragg the command of the brigade developed to Col. Manigault, and the regiment was led by its Lieutenant Colonel, James Pressley. In late July the brigade was transferred to Chattanooga by train as part of the army renamed to Army of Tennessee under command of Gen. Braxton Bragg; the II Corps now being Polk's. In November Col. Manigault was recommended to be promoted to brigadier general by Gen. Withers. The 10th took part in the Confederate Heartland Offensive, including the Battle of Munfordville, and afterwards in the Stones River Campaign and the Battle of Murfreesboro.

==== Battle of Murfreesboro ====
On December 28, 1862, Manigault's brigade moved into position for the battle. On December 29, Union cavalry, including the 15th Pennsylvania Cavalry, probed the skirmishers composed of companies A, B and C, but were repulsed. On December 31 the brigade was in the left center of the line, being part of the first line and laying opposite of Brig. Gen. Sheridan's Division (brigaded of Sill, Schaefer and Roberts) as left of McCook's wing. The 10th South Carolina formed the brigade's right, having the 19th South Carolina on the left, Anderson's brigade on the right and Maney's brigade in support as second line while Coltart's brigade was on the left of Manigault's brigade. Around 7 a.m. at the appointed time the brigade was part of the general advance. Repulsed by Sill's brigade it hold out against the Union's counterattack and mounted a counterattacked themselves; repulsing Sill, who lost his life. Then Robert's Illinois brigade fell on the advancing brigade's right—which was made of the 10th and 19th South Carolina, supported by Union artillery of Bush's and Houghtaling's batteries. With support from the neighboring Tennessee brigade the counterattacks were stopped, and in the following advance around 9 a.m. the Carolina regiments captured two 6-pounders from Bush's battery when Sheridan's division was completely driven back. Manigault's brigade stayed in reserve on this position for the rest of the battle The 10th South Carolina lost 16 dead, 91 wounded and 2 missed, making 109 total casualties.

=== 1863 ===
Retiring with the army the 10th South Carolina took its winter quarters near Shelbyville. In January 1863, as result of the high losses taken during the campaigns, the 10th was consolidated with the 19th South Carolina Infantry. Merging their 12 companies into 6, their commander stayed Lt. Col. Pressley. During the summer the consolidated 10th-19th South Carolina Infantry participated in the Tullahoma Campaign and the Middle Tennessee Operations. Retreating towards Georgia with the rest of the army, the 10th arrived at Chattanooga on July 8, 1863. When on the same day Manigault finally received his promotion to brigadier general, Pressley was promoted to colonel of the regiment. Major J.T. Porcher took his place as lieutenant colonel, himself being followed by Maj. R.G. White of the 19th. As the Regimental Adjutant Capt. C.I. Walker was officially appointed as Adjutant to the General his place was taken by L.R. Stark.

==== Battle of Chickamauga ====
Spending the August with marches on September 18 Manigault's brigade, a part of Hindman's division in Polk's corps, was positioned at the left of the Confederate lines near Chickamauga guarding the river crossing near the Lee & Gordon's Mill. On the next day the whole corps shifted north and took the positions previously held by Hood's corps. During the night the army was reorganized for the battle. As Gen. Polk was appointed to command the right wing of the army, his corps was split and Hindman's division was attached to the wing of Gen. James Longstreet, who just arrived from the Army of Northern Virginia. A general assault by the whole army on the morning of the 20th was planned, and the brigade formed the left of the division, now commanded by Gen. J. Patton Anderson. It was now the extreme left of the assault column; and faced elements of the Union XX Corps.

Starting its advance between 10 a.m. and 11 a.m. it strayed left, dividing the division front. In this split the 10th South Carolina was split, too. Several companies of under Col. Pressley attached themselves to the brigade on the right, commanded by Brig. Gen. Zachariah Deas. This brigade drove back two brigades of Davis's division and defeated Col. Bernard Laiboldt's brigade of Sheridan's division. Sheridan's two remaining brigades finally checked the Confederate advance west of the Dyer field near the Widow Glenn House. The greater portion of the regiment stayed with Manigault. The brigade crossed the field east of the Widow Glenn's house when Union Col. Wilder's mounted infantry brigade launched a strong counterattack. Armed with Spencer repeating rifles it drove Manigault's brigade around and through what became known as "Bloody Pond".

Later on that day, when the Union army took its defensive position on Horseshoe Ridge, the exhausted division was on the Confederate left again; Manigault's brigade now being the division's right. Facing Gordon Granger's Reserve Corps, supported by artillery Hindman's and Johnson's divisions tried to break the Union's lines, but the federals, partially armed with Colt revolving rifles, repulsed the assaulting Confederates. Fading daylight ended all hostilities, and the nightly retreat of Rosecrans' army ended the battle.

==== Late 1863 ====
When the Army of Tennessee advanced in the wake of its victory at Chickamauga it took position on Missionary Ridge and lay siege on Chattanooga, surrounding the Union army. Manigault's brigade was positioned in the center of the front Confederate line. In the ensuing Battle of Missionary Ridge on November 25, the 10th South Carolina and the brigade were attacked on the front and the left flank by the brigades of Willich and Beatty.

== Other regimental data ==
=== Commanding officers ===
Col. Arthur M. Manigault	May 31, 1861 — April 26, 1863 (on detached duty from June 1862, promoted to Brigadier)
Lt. Col. James F. Pressley	June 1862 — April 26, 1863 (acting)
Col. James F. Pressley	April 26, 1863 — July 22, 1864 (wounded & disabled)
Lt. Col. C. Irvine Walker	July 22, 1864 — July 28, 1864 (acting, wounded)
Cpt. B. B. MacWhite	July 28, 1864 — October 1864 (temporary)
Lt. Col. C. Irvine Walker	July 22, 1864 — March 1865 (acting, wounded)
Cpt. R.Z. Harlee	March 1865 — April 9, 1865 (temporary)
Lt. Col. C. Irvine Walker	April 9, 1865 — April 26, 1865

=== Casualties ===
- 16 killed, 91 wounded, and 2 missing at Murfreesboro
- 236 killed or wounded at Chickamauga
- 19 out of 24 officers lost at Atlanta

=== Confederate Honor Roll ===
- Battle of Murfreesboro
  - Beaty, J.S. - Pvt, Company B
  - Boatright, J.A. - Pvt, Company L (first award)
  - Bunch, J.W.H. - Pvt, Company K (killed in action)
  - Cannon, J. - Pvt, Company G
  - Flowers, G.S. - Pvt, Company D
  - Cockfield, C.W. - Sgt, Company E (killed in action)
  - Curry, G.W. - Pvt, Company F
  - Gray, N. - Pvt, Company H
  - Hewitt, W.D. - Pvt, Company C
  - Holmes, John E. - Pvt, Company A
  - McCants, A.J. - Pvt, Company A
  - Posten W.N. - Pvt, Company I
  - Rhuarck, S.B. - Sgt, Company M

- Battle of Chickamauga
  - Bird, S. - Sgt, Company D
  - Boatwright, J.A. - Pvt, Company L (second award)
  - Cannon, Cornelius - Pvt, Company C
  - Council, A.J. - Pvt, Company E
  - Foxworth, C.B. - Cpl, Company I
  - Glisson, E.B. - Cpl, Company F (killed in action)
  - Holmes, John E. - Pvt, Company A
  - Kirby, Samuel - Cpl, Company H
  - Owens, R.R. - Sgt, Company K
  - Rogers, E.T. - Pvt, Company M
  - Todd, P.P. - Pvt, Company B

== See also ==
- List of South Carolina Confederate Civil War units

== Sources ==
- Walker, C. Irvine; Rolls and historical sketch of the Tenth Regiment, So. Ca. Volunteers, in the army of the Confederate States; Walker, Evans & Cogswell, Printers; 1881
- War Department; The War of the Rebellion : a compilation of the official records of the Union and Confederate armies; Series I; Washington, D.C.; 1881–1901
