= 4th Louisiana Infantry Battalion =

Infantry regiment of the Confederate States Army

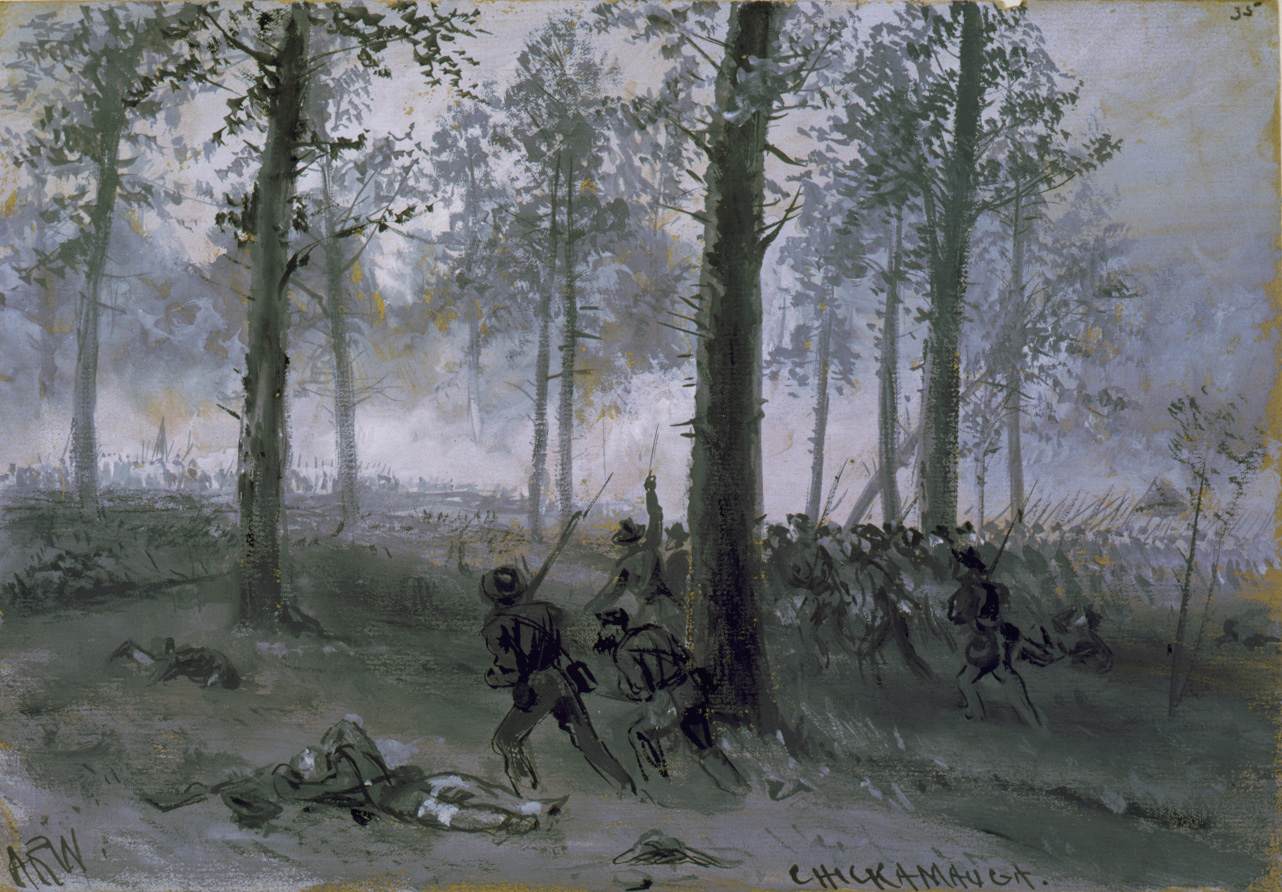
- The 4th Louisiana Battalion suffered heavy losses on September 19, 1863, at the Battle of Chickamauga.
- Active: 10 July 1861 – 8 May 1865
- Country: Confederate States of America
- Allegiance: Confederate States of America; Louisiana
- Branch: Confederate States Army
- Type: Infantry
- Size: Battalion (561 men, July 1861)
- Engagements: American Civil War; Western Virginia campaign (1861); Battle of Secessionville (1862); Siege of Jackson (1863); Battle of Chickamauga (1863); Battle of Missionary Ridge (1863); Battle of Resaca (1864); Battle of New Hope Church (1864); Battle of Ezra Church (1864); Battle of Jonesborough (1864); Battle of Spanish Fort (1865)

Commanders
- Notable commanders: John McEnery

The 4th Louisiana Infantry Battalion was an infantry unit recruited from Louisiana volunteers that fought in the Confederate States Army during the American Civil War. The unit organized as a battalion in July 1861 and initially served as prison guards. In November the battalion served briefly in the Western Virginia campaign. From 1862 to Spring 1863 the battalion guarded Savannah, Georgia, Charleston, South Carolina, and Wilmington, North Carolina, fighting at Secessionville in June 1862. The unit traveled west where it fought at Jackson, Chickamauga, and Missionary Ridge in 1863. The battalion fought in the Atlanta campaign in 1864. Assigned to defend Mobile, Alabama, the battalion fought at Spanish Fort in April 1865. One month later, the remnant of the unit surrendered.

== Formation and commanders ==
The 4th Louisiana Infantry Battalion organized in Richmond, Virginia on 10 July 1861. Major George C. Waddill was in command of 561 men in five companies. At first, the battalion was detailed to act as President Jefferson Davis' bodyguard and also as prison guards. In December 1861, Waddill resigned and was replaced as major by John McEnery. In April 1862, Company F joined the battalion. On 20 May 1862, McEnery was promoted lieutenant colonel and ten days later Duncan Buie was promoted major. On 18 August 1864, McEnery was detached from the battalion. Buie was detached sometime later, and Samuel L. Bishop became temporary major. The organization was as shown below.

Company information for the 4th Louisiana Infantry Battalion
| Company | Nickname | Captains | Recruitment Parish |
|---|---|---|---|
| A | Madison Infantry | W. J. Powell | Madison |
| B | Ouachita Blues | John McEnery (p); Frank N. Marks (k); A. B. Hardy | Ouachita |
| C | Franklin Life Guard | Duncan Buie (p); J. Laurence Ward | Franklin |
| D | Carroll Rebels | Edward L. Coleman (k); L. E. Stowers | Carroll |
| E | Natchez Rebels | Alfred V. Davis (r-1861); T. Alex Bisland | Mississippi (state) |
| F | Ouachita Rebels | James H. Walker (r-1863); Thomas N. Conner | Ouachita |

- Key: k = killed at Chickamauga, p = promoted, r = resigned.

== Service ==
=== 1861–1862 ===
The 4th Infantry Battalion was reorganized on 19 September 1861 before being sent to serve in West Virginia. On 1–10 November 1861, it skirmished with Federal soldiers at Cotton Hill in the Kanawha Valley. After returning to Richmond in December, the unit entrained for South Carolina. It garrisoned Skidaway Island, Georgia, then on 17 March 1862 the battalion occupied the Isle of Hope, Georgia. On 21 April, it moved to Camp Mercer near Savannah where it was joined by Company F. On 4 June, the battalion transferred to James Island near Charleston. On 10 June, the unit skirmished with Union forces. On 16 June, the battalion fought in the Battle of Secessionville and helped repulse the second Federal attack. The unit lost 6 killed and 22 wounded in the battle. From 7 July to 14 December 1862, the battalion garrisoned Savannah before being assigned to defend Wilmington.

=== 1863 ===
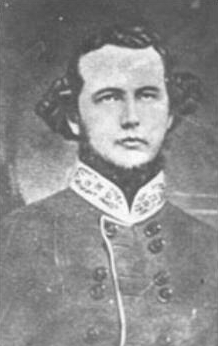
Claudius C. Wilson

In February 1863, the 4th Battalion left Wilmington and returned to Savannah. In May, the unit left Savannah and transferred to Mississippi. Arthur W. Bergeron Jr. stated that the battalion fought in the Battle of Jackson on 14 May. Battles & Leaders and Timothy B. Smith both indicated that it was not engaged in that action. The battalion became part of General Joseph E. Johnston's army and served in the Siege of Jackson from 9–16 July. In August, it became part of the Army of Tennessee.

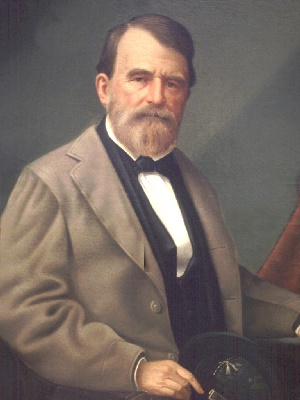
John McEnery

At the Battle of Chickamauga, the battalion was assigned to Colonel Claudius C. Wilson's brigade, which was part of Brigadier General States Rights Gist's division in Major General William H. T. Walker's Reserve Corps. At 8:00 am on 19 September, Major General Nathan B. Forrest asked for help but Wilson declined until he could get authorization from Walker. After an hour passed, Wilson's brigade was sent into action against Colonel John T. Croxton's Federal brigade with the 4th Louisiana Battalion on the brigade's left flank. In a fire-fight, Wilson's troops pressed their opponents steadily back in the forest. Hearing the sound of gunfire approaching, Major General George Henry Thomas sent a Union division to assist Croxton. Wilson's brigade soon ran into two fresh Union brigades and was badly mauled. It only escaped annihilation because the Federals became confused in the deep forest, but Wilson's brigade was reduced to less than 450 men. Wilson's brigade reported losing 99 killed, 426 wounded, and 80 missing, for a total of 605 casualties. Every officer present in the 4th Battalion was killed or wounded except one lieutenant, and more than half the men were casualties. Captains Frank N. Marks of B Company and Edward L. Coleman of D Company were both killed.

On 12 November 1863, the 4th Louisiana Battalion transferred to Colonel Randall L. Gibson's brigade. Gibson was the temporary commander of Brigadier General Daniel Weisiger Adams's brigade. During the Chattanooga campaign, Gibson's all-Louisiana brigade was in Major General Alexander P. Stewart's division which was part of Major General John C. Breckinridge's corps. During the Battle of Missionary Ridge on 25 November, Gibson's was the right-most brigade in Stewart's defenses on the ridge. Missionary Ridge is an imposing natural feature, but overconfident Breckinridge and army commander General Braxton Bragg completely mismanaged the Confederate defenses. When the Federals attacked the ridge, the brigades to Gibson's right began to break up and scatter. Attacked in front and flank, the soldiers of Gibson's brigade put up a futile resistance, but then had to run for it. Gibson's brigade reported losing 28 killed, 96 wounded, and 233 missing, for a total of 357 casualties.

=== 1864–1865 ===
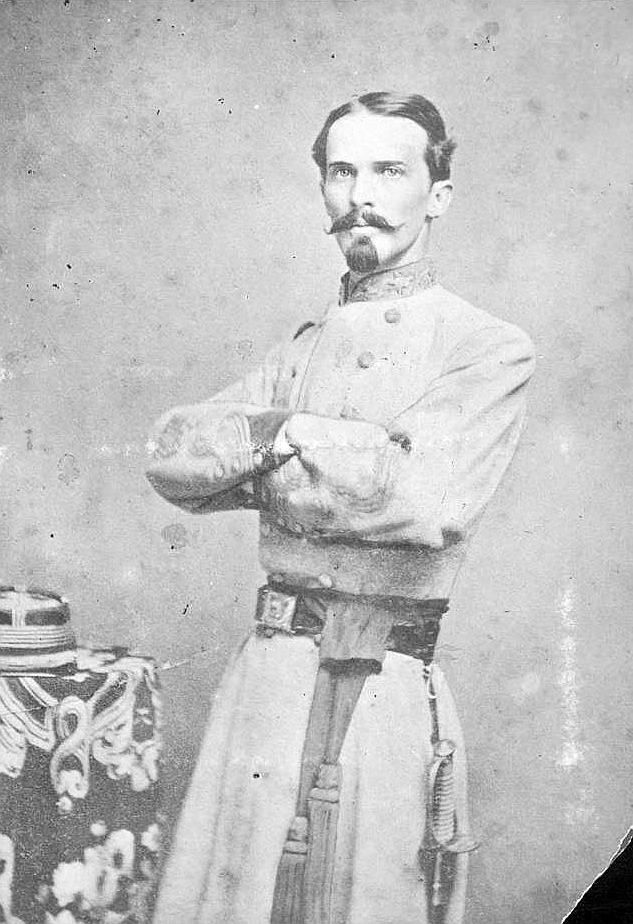
Randall L. Gibson

Gibson's brigade spent the winter of 1863–1864 near Dalton, Georgia. In the Atlanta campaign, the 4th Louisiana Battalion remained in Gibson's brigade, which formed part of Stewart's division in Lieutenant General John Bell Hood's corps. During the campaign, the battalion was commanded variously by Lieutenant Colonel McEnery, Major Duncan Buie, Captain W. J. Powell, and Captain T. A. Bisland. It fought in the Battle of Resaca on 13–16 May 1864, Battle of New Hope Church on 25–28 May, Battle of Ezra Church on 28 July, and Battle of Jonesborough on 31 August. On 15 May at Resaca, Stewart's division was ordered to attack with Gibson's brigade in the second line. The attack failed with 1,000 casualties, but Gibson's brigade was called back before it became seriously involved. However, McEnery was severely wounded at Resaca. At New Hope Church on 25 May, Major General Joseph Hooker's corps attacked Stewart's division. Even though Hooker outnumbered Stewart 16,000 to 4,000, the Confederates repulsed the assault. Part of Gibson's brigade was engaged on the left flank of the division. Gibson's brigade started the campaign with 85 officers and 889 enlisted men. Through 1 June, the brigade lost 4 officers killed and 13 wounded, and 34 enlisted men killed, 150 wounded, and 19 missing.

During the Battle of Atlanta on 22 July, Stewart's division, now commanded by Major General Henry DeLamar Clayton was ordered to attack. However, because of interference by another general, Gibson's brigade was left in the rear without orders. At Ezra Church on 28 July, the new corps commander was Lieutenant General Stephen D. Lee. After the initial Confederate attack failed, an aide to Lee ordered Gibson's brigade to attack without notifying Clayton. Gibson's men made the assault, but it was stopped when it encountered entrenched Union troops. Clayton halted the attack when he saw it was not successful. Gibson's brigade suffered 480 casualties in the botched operation. However, the 4th Battalion captured a Federal artillery flag. At Jonesborough on 31 August, the Confederate assault completely failed with heavy losses. Gibson's brigade, which had already lost half its soldiers at Ezra Church, was reduced by half again.

During the Nashville campaign in late 1864, the 4th Battalion guarded a pontoon bridge over the Duck River and never came into action. In this campaign, Captain Bisland led the battalion. In February 1865, the battalion consolidated with the 25th Louisiana Infantry Regiment at Mobile, Alabama. The new unit fought at the Battle of Spanish Fort from 27 March to 8 April 1865. In another reorganization, Companies A, B, and D became Company F of the Pelican Regiment while Companies C, E, and F became Company G. The Pelican Regiment surrendered on 8 May 1865 at Gainesville, Alabama.

== See also ==
- List of Louisiana Confederate Civil War units
- Louisiana in the Civil War
