= Jules A. Masicot =

American politician

Louisiana House of Representatives
- In office 1868–1872

Louisiana State Senate
- In office 1872–1876

Personal details
- Born: 1837/8 Louisiana
- Party: Republican

Jules A. Masicot (born 1837/8) was a state legislator in Louisiana. He served in the Louisiana House of Representatives and Louisiana State Senate and at the state's 1868 constitutional convention.

== Biography ==
Masicot was born 1837/8 in Louisiana and was educated with four years at college.

He served in the 1st Louisiana Cavalry Regiment during the American Civil War as a lieutenant. During the New Orleans massacre of 1866 he was inside the Mechanics' institute but escaped unharmed.

In 1868 Masicot served in the state constitutional convention and was elected recorder for the third district. He was the sheriff of the Orleans Parish from 1869 until 1870.

Masicot served in the Louisiana House of Representatives from 1868 until 1872 and in the Louisiana State Senate from 1872 until 1876, as a Republican.

He served as Chairman of the Committee on Engrossment and Enrolment.

The Democrats were accused of election fraud in 1872 against Masicot and other Republicans.

== See also ==
- African American officeholders from the end of the Civil War until before 1900

== Notes ==
- His surname was spelt with only one s (Masicot) in contemporaneous documents however the Louisiana House of Representatives records and Eric Foner's "Freedom’s Lawmakers" list as Massicot.
