= 47th Georgia Infantry Regiment =

Infantry regiment of the Confederate States Army

- Unofficial Georgia flag prior to 1879
- Active: June, 1861–April 26, 1865
- Country: Confederate States of America
- Allegiance: Georgia
- Branch: Confederate States Army
- Type: Infantry
- Engagements: American Civil War: James Island; Siege of Jackson; Kennesaw Mountain; Resaca; Missionary Ridge; Chickamauga; Carolinas campaign

The 47th Georgia Infantry Regiment was an infantry regiment in the Confederate States Army during the American Civil War.

== History ==
The regiment was first organized during the winter of 1861–1862 with men recruited from Mitchell, Randolph, Bulloch, Chatham, Screven, Tattnall, Appling, Bryan, Liberty, and Dodge counties. It was reorganized on May 12, 1862, when the 11th Battalion Georgia Infantry was merged into it. Until that time, the soldiers had spent most of their time guarding the Georgia coast. However, sometime in May, after the new 47th was organized, they were ordered to Charleston, South Carolina. They fought in their first engagement of the Battle of Secessionville on June 10, 1862, at James Island, where forty out of seventy men were killed or wounded.

They then served in North Carolina until May 1863 when the regiment was ordered to Vicksburg, Mississippi, as a part of General John C. Breckinridge’s division under Joe Johnston. The regiment saw action at the Siege of Jackson. Three months later, in August, they were sent to serve with General Braxton Bragg in the Army of Tennessee, fighting in such battles as Kennesaw Mountain, Resaca, Missionary Ridge and Chickamauga before returning to the East to defend Savannah, Georgia.

In 1865, the 47th Infantry participated in the Carolinas campaign. The remaining men surrendered to William T. Sherman on April 26, 1865, and were paroled.

The field officers during the war were Colonels A.C. Edwards and G.W.M. Williams, Lieutenant Colonels Joseph S. Cone and William S. Phillips, and Major James G. Cone.

=== Companies ===
- A Company (Mitchell Volunteer Guards) was formed in Chatham County, Georgia.
- B Company was formed in Randolph County, Georgia.
- C Company (Bulloch Guards) was formed in Bulloch County, Georgia.
- D Company (Screven Guards) was formed in Screven County, Georgia.
- E Company (Chatham Volunteers) was formed in Chatham, Bryan and Effingham Counties, Georgia.
- F Company (Appling Rangers) was formed in Appling County, Georgia.
- G Company (Tattnall Invincibles) was formed in Tattnall County, Georgia.
- H Company was formed in Glynn County, Georgia.
- I Company (Empire State Guards) was formed in Effingham County, Georgia.
- K Company was formed in Bulloch County, Georgia.

=== Battles ===
- Secessionville, South Carolina (6/16/62)
- Siege of Jackson, Mississippi (7/11/63)
- Siege of Chattanooga, Tennessee (9/63 - 11/63)
- Chickamauga, Georgia (9/19/63 - 9/20/63) in John C. Breckinridge's division
- Chattanooga, Tennessee (11/23/63 - 11/25/63)
- Atlanta campaign, Georgia (5/64 - 9/64) in William H. T. Walker's division
- Savannah Campaign, Georgia (11/64 - 12/64)
- Tullifiny Station, South Carolina (12/9/64)
- Carolinas campaign (2/65 - 4/30/65)

== See also ==
- List of Civil War regiments from Georgia
