= Arthur Middleton Manigault =

Confederate generals (1824–1886)

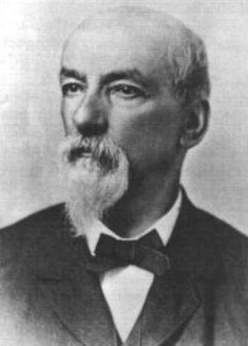
- Arthur Middleton Manigault
- Born: October 26, 1824; Charleston, South Carolina
- Died: August 17, 1886 (aged 61); Georgetown County, South Carolina
- Burial place: Magnolia Cemetery, Charleston, South Carolina
- Military career
- Allegiance: United States of America; Confederate States of America
- Branch: Confederate States Army
- Service years: 1861–1864 (C.S.A)
- Rank: Brigadier General
- Conflicts: Mexican–American War: Battle of Chapultepec; American Civil War: Battle of Fort Sumter; Battle of Stone's River; Battle of Chickamauga; The Atlanta Campaign; Battle of Resaca; Second Battle of Franklin
- Other work: Adjutant and Inspector General of South Carolina, 1880–86

Arthur Middleton Manigault (October 26, 1824 – August 17, 1886) was a brigadier general in the Confederate States Army during the American Civil War.

== Early life and career ==
Manigault was born in Charleston, South Carolina in 1824. His parents were Joseph and Charlotte Manigault. His grandfather, Peter Manigault, was the richest person in British North America in 1770. Joseph Manigault's great-great-grandfather was Pierre Manigault (1664–1729), a French Huguenot who was born in La Rochelle, France and settled in Charleston. His mother was both the daughter of Charles Drayton, a South Carolina Lt. Governor, and the granddaughter of Henry Middleton, the second President of the First Continental Congress, whose grandfather, Edward Middleton, emigrated from England via Barbados. Her uncle, Arthur Middleton, was one of the signers of the Declaration of Independence.

Manigault attended the College of Charleston, although he abandoned his studies to pursue an interest in business. During the Mexican–American War, he served in the United States Army as a first lieutenant with the Palmetto Regiment. From 1847 to 1856, he was a businessman in Charleston. On April 15, 1850 he married Mary Proctor Huger, the granddaughter of Daniel Elliott Huger. They had five children together. In 1856, he inherited a rice plantation in Georgetown County, South Carolina and moved there.

== Civil War ==
A few days before the outbreak of the Civil War, Manigault participated in the Battle of Fort Sumter. He was colonel of the 10th South Carolina Infantry, and helped construct the batteries for the defense of Winyah Bay in Georgetown County. In March 1862, he was ordered to dismantle the coastal batteries and to ship the guns to Charleston. In April 1862, he was commanded to take his troops and report to General P. G. T. Beauregard with the Army of Mississippi.

In northern Mississippi, Manigault saw action during the Siege of Corinth. Afterwards he served with the reorganized Army of Tennessee and saw action at the Battles of Stone's River and Chickamauga. He was present during the Battle of Missionary Ridge. During the late spring and summer of 1864, he participated in the Atlanta campaign.

On April 26, 1863, he was promoted to brigadier general. During the war, he was wounded twice: first in Georgia at the Battle of Resaca in May 1864, and then at the Second Battle of Franklin during November 1864. His second injury prevented his return to active service.

== Postbellum activities ==
After the war, Manigault returned to manage his rice plantation in South Carolina. From 1880 to 1886, he served as the Adjutant and Inspector General of South Carolina. He died in Georgetown County, South Carolina in 1886 and is buried in the Magnolia Cemetery in Charleston.

== See also ==
- List of American Civil War generals (Confederate)
- Stones River Confederate order of battle
- Chickamauga Confederate order of battle
- Franklin II Confederate order of battle
- List of Huguenots
