= Graves' Battery =

Confederate States Army artillery unit

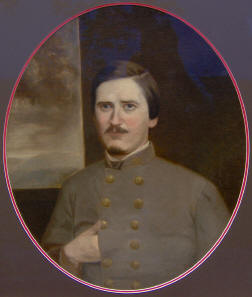
Major Rice E. Graves Civil War portrait, 1862

Graves' Artillery Battery, also known as [Kentucky] Issaquena Artillery Battery, was organized as a Confederate States Army artillery battery from Mississippi and Kentucky (mainly Kentucky) on November 8, 1861. During its formation, as a still understrength battery, the first commander was Captain Selden Spencer. In December, at Bowling Green, Kentucky, then Confederate Army Brigadier General (CSA) John C. Breckinridge chose Captain Rice E. Graves, Jr., as captain of the new battery to be attached to the 2nd Kentucky Infantry Regiment and assigned to his division. The unit was first assigned to Reserve, 1st Geographical Division, Department #2. Then the regiment was assigned to the Kentucky Brigade, Army of Middle Tennessee, Department #2 in October–November 1862. In November 1862, the regiment was assigned to the Kentucky Brigade, Breckinridge's Division, 1st Corps, Army of Tennessee in November 1862, nicknamed the "Orphan Brigade".

== Graves ==
Rice Evan Graves Jr., was attending the United States Military Academy at West Point, New York, on a Presidential appointment recommended by the Kentucky second congressional district representative Samuel O. Peyton, when he resigned to join the Confederate Army at Camp Boone in Saint Bethlehem, Tennessee Graves was born in Virginia and raised near Yelvington, Kentucky, about 12 miles east of Owensboro, Kentucky on Kentucky Highway 144.

== Armament ==
The battery initially was armed with two 6-pound smoothbores and two 12-pound howitzers.

== Battles ==
Major Graves led his battery at the Battle of Fort Donelson near Dover, Tennessee, where he was taken prisoner and his artillery confiscated when the Fort was surrendered by the Confederates to the Union Army forces commanded by then Brigadier General Ulysses S. Grant. Colonel, Later brigadier General, Roger Hanson and the 2d Kentucky prisoners were exchanged on August 5, 1862. At the Battle of Stones River at Murfreesboro, Tennessee Graves was severely wounded. Breckinridge's division was sent to Vicksburg too late to reinforce the Confederate garrison before they surrendered on July 4, 1863. The 1st Kentucky Brigade moved to Jackson, Mississippi on July 7, 1863, and after being engaged at the Siege of Jackson, retreated from there on July 16 when the Confederates abandoned the city. Major Graves was mortally wounded at the Battle of Chickamauga on September 20, 1864, and died by the next morning.

The brigade went on to fight in the Atlanta campaign and in retreat to Savannah and South Carolina, At end if the war, the brigade was direct to Washington, Georgia to surrender and take parole on May 7, 1865.

== Fort Donelson Monument ==
The Fort Donelson National Battlefield, maintained by the U.S. National Park Service at Dover, Tennessee has a large section of the battlefield named in honor of Major Graves entitled "Graves Battery".

== See also ==
- List of Kentucky Civil War Confederate units
- List of Kentucky Civil War Units
- Kentucky in the Civil War
