= Melancthon Smith =

Confederate Colonel during American Civil War

Member of the Mississippi House of Representatives from Clarke County

Member of the Mississippi House of Representatives from Mississippi
- In office 1857–1859
- Preceded by: Unknown
- Succeeded by: Unknown

Personal details
- Born: April 15, 1829 Mobile, Alabama
- Died: November 1, 1881 (aged 52) Mobile, Alabama
- Spouse(s): Mary Emma (Forney) Smith (October 13, 1833 – February 8, 1870); Clara (Howze) Smith
- Profession: Planter, Militia Officer, Journalist

Military service
- Allegiance: United States of America; Confederate States of America
- Branch/service: United States Army; Confederate States Army (Artillery)
- Years of service: 1851–1854 (USA); 1861–1865 (CSA)
- Rank: 2nd Lieutenant (USA); Major General (MS Militia); Colonel (CSA)
- Unit: 8th U.S. Infantry Regiment
- Commands: Right Wing—Mobile Defenses; Artillery—Cheatham's Corps; Artillery—D.H. Hill's Corps; Artillery—Hardee's Corps; Artillery—Cheatham's Division; Smith's (Mississippi) Battery
- Battles/wars: American Civil War: Battle of Belmont; Battle of Shiloh; Siege of Corinth; Battle of Perryville; Battle of Stones River; Battle of Chickamauga; Chattanooga campaign; Atlanta campaign; Franklin-Nashville Campaign; Battle of Fort Blakeley

Melancthon Smith (frequently spelled Melancton or Melanchton; April 15, 1829 – November 1, 1881) was a colonel in the Confederate States Army during the American Civil War. A graduate of the United States Military Academy, he served with the artillery of the Army of Tennessee in the Western Theater. After the war he became a journalist.

== Early life ==
=== West Point ===
Melancthon Smith was born in Mobile, Alabama on April 15, 1829. He was a soldier's son, his father an artillery captain stationed at the Mount Vernon Arsenal. Smith received an appointment to the United States Military Academy at West Point by the state of Alabama, and on July 1, 1845, the 16 year old Melancthon was admitted to the class of 1849. However, in his second year he was found deficient in mathematics, getting the worst grades in the class, and was turned back into the class of 1850. His grades became much better, though he was short of dismissal when he accumulated 196 demerits over the year (200 being the allowed maximum). In the next year Smith was suspended from the academy, and thus not examined.

This resulted in being turned back again, putting him in the class of 1851. The year 1850 brought Smith close to failing again, just short of being deficient in Chemistry and accumulating 177 demerits; but in the end he managed to pass the year and became a Firstie, or first class cadet. In his last year he accumulated the allowed 200 demerits, what made him the second worst cadet currently at the academy, and once again short of failing. But he didn't; his grades were all in the last quarter of his class, except engineering, and he graduated as 36th out of 42 graduates on July 1, 1851.

As a fellow cadet described him:

In personal appearance he was tall and slim; a countenance
handsome, firm, and decided, yet merry and laughing in social life.
His mind was finely cultivated, clear, and well balanced; as
a writer, he wielded a graceful and fluent pen.

— "Melancthon Smith" in 13th Annual Reunion of the Association of the Graduates of the United States Military Academy, at West Point, New York; TIMES PRINTING HOUSE, Philadelphia; June 12, 1882

=== The U.S. Army and the Antebellum ===
On the same day Smith was appointed a Brevet 2nd Lieutenant of Infantry and posted to the Texan frontier in the 8th U.S. Infantry Regiment, in the company of Bvt. Major James Longstreet. He served at Fort McKavett and Camp Johnston and was finally commissioned as a full 2nd Lieutenant on December 7, 1852. He continued his frontier duty at Fort Chadbourne and Ringgold Barracks until he resigned his officer commission on November 9, 1854.

He moved to eastern Mississippi to become a planter. In 1853 he married Mary Emma Minnie Forney of Huntsville, Alabama; and their marriage eventually brought two daughters and two sons. Getting active in the Mississippi Militia he was elected Major General in 1857, and commanded the 2nd Division, representing the 14 southern counties of Mississippi. About this time he also was elected as the representative of Clarke County to the State Legislature; and as Chairman of the Military Committee of the House.

== Civil War ==
=== 1861 & 1862 ===
When on January 3, 6 days before Mississippi's and 8 days before Alabama's secession, militia forces under Colonel John B. Todd seized the Mount Vernon Arsenal, Fort Morgan and Fort Gaines Smith accompanied the troops as a volunteer. On January 6 he was commissioned a captain of Alabama Volunteers (Ordnance Department), and placed in command of the Mount Vernon Arsenal, the place his father had built 30 years before. When in April the Arsenal was turned over to Confederate authorities Smith was appointed Alabama's adjutant general with the rank of colonel, and served at the headquarters of General-in-Chief Jesse Clemens. Preferring active duty he resigned his post, traveled to Mississippi and accepted a captaincy of a company from his Clarke County.

Organizing his company into a battery of light artillery. In September Smith's (Mississippi) Battery, as it was named, became part of the brigade of Brigadier Benjamin F. Cheatham in the Army of Tennessee. It participated in the Battle of Belmont, where it shelled the federal troops on the opposite river bank and shot on the gunboats that transported U. S. Grant. After the indecisive battle he received praise by commanding Major General Leonidas Polk. At the Battle of Shiloh on April 6 the 6-gun battery was still with the brigade, now under command of Colonel William H. Stephens. It fought an artillery duel with the 1st Minnesota Light Artillery Battery before it formed the rightmost part of Ruggles's Battery. On April 7 a two-gun section under Lt. Eckford fought on the Confederate left; and when the battle ended the battery had swapped three of its pieces for three rifled James cannons. Smith's service was officially noted by General Cheatham.

On July 12, 1862, Smith was appointed chief of artillery of Cheatham's Division; and was promoted to major in August. The artillery batteries were still assigned to the individual brigades, but beside his own old battery (now under Lieutenant William B. Turner) he had Standord's Mississippi, Carnes' Tennessee and Scott's Tennessee batteries. In the Battle of Perryville he commanded 16 guns. The battle turned out a lucky day for both the army and Smith, whose battalion captured 7 guns and numerous artillery supplies. He continued his command in the Battle of Stones River, though in the initial day he was not present marching in the rear of the army.

=== 1863, 1864 & 1865 ===
As senior artillery officer in the corps Smith acted as Chief of Artillery on numerous occasions from 1862 on. Around the same time the battery commanders of the division personally petitioned the Confederate States War Department, requesting a promotion for Smith. As the Confederate laws failed to provide enough field officers for the artillery, and lacked the urge to deal with the organisational shortages of its western armies, the petition was denied. By the Battle of Chickamauga in fall 1863 the five artillery batteries in the division were consolidated into a battalion under Smith's command; and he led his battalion into the Chattanooga campaign.

In early 1863 there occurred extreme deficiencies in the ordnance stores. Paper fuses and friction primers were describes as useless, gunpowder of low quality, leather goods and wood in bad condition and the guns themselves wearing down. In consequence General Braxton Bragg appointed an artillery board in June; and Smith was part of it. Proceeding against the Army of Tennessee's chief ordnance officer, Lt. Col. Hypolite Oladowski, and the worsening conditions on the homefront the board was able to make several recommendations; but it took time for Bragg to modernize his artillery.

On February 10, 1864, by order of Generals Johnston and Hardee, the four artillery battalions in Hardee's corps were officially merged into the corps artillery regiment, and Smith, still a major, was assigned to its command. Hardee recommended his promotion to lieutenant colonel, and General Johnston joined in the recommendation. In May 1864 now Lieutenant Colonel Smith served in the Atlanta campaign, including the Battle of Peachtree Creek. The campaign was disastrous for the Confederacy and the artillery. While in the retreat Smith was able to save 28 guns. His corps artillery lost about all other equipment . He continued to lead the corps artillery during the Franklin-Nashville Campaign.

In January 1865 the artillery of the Army of Tennessee was broken up and over half of the Neglected branch of the Army as Smith called it was transferred to the Mobile Bay under Smith's command. In April Colonel Smith fought in the Battle of Fort Blakeley during the Mobile Campaign, leading the right wing of the defenses of Mobile. On April 9 the fort, commanded by Gen. Liddell was stormed, thus ending the war for Melancthon Smith.

=== Rank issue ===
There is an unsolved issue about his final rank. Sources like the promotion recommendations from Generals Hardee and Johnston speak for a promotion from major to lieutenant colonel in early 1864. There are several authors who speak of a promotion either from major to colonel or from lieutenant colonel to colonel – what gives those voices credibility is the most common date when the promotion was dated, February 20, 1864. His microfilmed muster roll also lists his highest rank as colonel. In the Official Records on most occasions everyone (Lt. Col. or Col.) is simply addressed as Col., including Smith in the later war years. However, there is a single document in which Smith and other artillery officers are strictly differed into lieutenant colonels and colonels. This document refers to Smith as (full) colonel. It is authorized by Major General Arnold Elzey, commanding the artillery of the Army of Tennessee; and written by Captain Charles Swett, Elzey's inspector general, on December 21, 1864.

== Later life ==
When the war ended Smith returned to farming on his homestead. His wife died in 1870, and he married Mary Howze in 1872, losing his second wife only two years later. The disturbed state of the country, and the loss of his mill by fire, caused him to sell out in 1871. He became principal of the high school in Enterprise, but left the post in 1874 to become a newspaper editor. Initially working for the Pascagoula (Mississippi) Democrat-Star he moved to his childhood homestead of Mobile, Alabama in May 1877. After a short-lived career at the Mobile (Ala.) Cycle he started to edit the Mobile News, a daily paper, until his failing health caused him to retire. Stricken with tuberculosis that left him an invalid for several years he died on November 1, 1881.

== See also ==
- Field artillery in the American Civil War
