= Pinckney Downie Bowles =

American lawyer

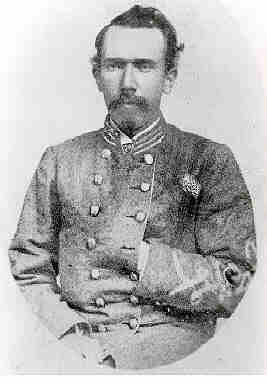
- Born: July 17, 1835; Edgefield County, South Carolina
- Died: July 25, 1910 (aged 75); Tampa, Florida
- Burial place: Old Historical Cemetery; Evergreen, Conecuh County, Alabama
- Spouse: Alice Irene Stearns Bowles
- Military career
- Allegiance: Confederate States of America
- Branch: Confederate States Army
- Service years: 1861-1865
- Rank: Colonel; Acting Brigadier General (unconfirmed)
- Unit: 4th Alabama Infantry
- Conflicts: American Civil War

Pinckney Downie Bowles (July 17, 1835 – July 25, 1910) was a lawyer, county prosecutor, probate judge, and a Confederate military officer during the American Civil War.

== Early years ==
Pinckney D. Bowles was born in Edgefield County, South Carolina, to a wealthy plantation family. His parents were Isaac Bowles and Emily Holloway Bowles.

He was educated at the South Carolina Military Academy, now known as The Citadel, in Charleston, South Carolina and at the University of Virginia. He studied law under Samuel McGowan at Abbeville, South Carolina. In 1859, Bowles moved to Alabama to practice law in Conecuh County.

== Military service ==
In 1860, Bowles entered state militia service as the colonel of the 28th Alabama Militia. He also served as first lieutenant in the local Conecuh Guards, and was later promoted to its captain after the Civil War began. He and his men were sent to Florida, and then on to Virginia, there to join what became the Army of Northern Virginia.

On May 2, 1861, while stationed in Yorktown, Virginia, Bowles was re-elected as a captain in the 4th Alabama Infantry Regiment. He fought in the Seven Days Battles in June and July 1862 around Richmond, Virginia, a series of battles that resulted in a significant setback for Union troops attempting to capture the capital of the Confederacy. In August 1862, shortly before the Second Battle of Bull Run, or the Battle of Second Manassas, Bowles was promoted to major. He was promoted to lieutenant colonel shortly after the Maryland Campaign, and days later to colonel.

He was married, during the Civil War, at Sparta, Alabama, on February 24, 1863, to Alice Irene, daughter of Judge N. F. and Anna C. Stearns. They had three children, Catherine, Mary Ella and Minnalula.

Bowles led the 4th Alabama at Fredericksburg, Chancellorsville, much of the Gettysburg campaign, and during the Overland Campaign of 1864. He commanded Law's Brigade in the Army of Northern Virginia between June 3, 1864 and September 1864 while Law was recovering from wounds. In the last months of the war, he led a brigade of five regiments. Although some sources state he was finally commissioned as a brigadier general on April 2, 1865, in fact there is no record of any such promotion. While Bowles may have commanded a hastily organized brigade of two regiments (or perhaps the five regiments mentioned in earlier sources) and some reserves under Brigadier General James Walker during the Appomattox Campaign, and Allardice found no evidence that the reserve units were in Walker's division, this would not have required his promotion.

Although Bowles often was engaged in heavy fighting and had his canteen shattered by a bullet at the Battle of First Bull Run and his cap shot from his hand at the Battle of Spotsylvania, he was never wounded during the war.

== Postbellum years ==
After the end of the war, Bowles returned home to practice law in Sparta, before moving to Evergreen, Alabama, when the county seat relocated there. For ten years between 1867 and 1877, he served as the county prosecutor before devoting himself full-time to private practice. His business flourished, and Bowles became one of the leading lawyers in southern Alabama.

He was active in the Episcopalian Church, the Democratic Party and the Freemasons. He also was a "general" in the United Confederate Veterans. He served as a probate judge from 1887 until 1898.

Bowles died in Tampa, Florida, and is buried in the Old Historical Cemetery in Evergreen, Alabama.

== See also ==
- List of American Civil War generals (Acting Confederate)
