= Claudius C. Wilson =

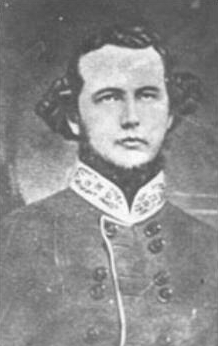
- Born: October 1, 1831; Effingham County, Georgia
- Died: November 27, 1863 (aged 32); Ringgold, Georgia
- Burial place: Savannah, Georgia
- Military career
- Allegiance: Confederate States of America
- Branch: Confederate States Army
- Service years: 1861–1863
- Rank: Colonel; Brigadier General (posthumous)
- Conflicts: American Civil War

Claudius Charles Wilson (October 1, 1831 – November 27, 1863) was a Confederate States Army colonel and brigade commander during the American Civil War. Wilson's promotion to brigadier general on November 16, 1863, was confirmed posthumously. Wilson was a lawyer and U.S. Solicitor general for eastern Georgia before the Civil War. Wilson died of a fever while in camp at Ringgold, Georgia, on November 26, 1863.

== Early life ==
Claudius C. Wilson was born October 1, 1831, at Effingham County, Georgia. He was the son of Dr. Josiah Stewart Wilson of Liberty County, Georgia, and the great-grandson of Brigadier General Daniel Stewart, a brigadier general in the Georgia Militia who served during the American Revolutionary War and the War of 1812.

Wilson graduated with highest honors from Emory College in Oxford, Georgia, in 1851. He became a lawyer at Savannah, Georgia, the following year. In 1859, he was elected U.S. Solicitor general for eastern Georgia, but he resigned in 1860 to resume his practice with the firm of Wilson, Norwood and Lester at Savannah.

Wilson married Katharine McDuffie Morrison on September 14, 1852. They had four children, two of whom, John M. Wilson and Anna Belle Karow, were living in Savannah, Georgia, when their mother died in May 1904.

== American Civil War service ==
Claudius C. Wilson began his Confederate Army Civil War service as a captain in the 25th Georgia Infantry Regiment, which he helped to raise, on August 9, 1861. He was promoted to colonel of the regiment on September 2, 1861. In 1862, the regiment was stationed at points along the coasts of South Carolina and Georgia, including Tybee Island until the Confederates evacuated it and including Savannah. Wilson acted as a brigade commander during much of this time.

Wilson became a brigade commander in Major General William H.T. Walker's division in June 1863. The division was variously assigned to the Department of the West in June 1863–July 1863; the Department of Mississippi and East Louisiana, July 1863–August 23, 1863; Acting Lieutenant General Daniel Harvey Hill's Corps, Army of Tennessee, August 25, 1863–September 1863; the Reserve Corps, Army of Tennessee, September 1863; Lieutenant General James Longstreet's Corps, Army of Tennessee, September 26, 1863–November 12, 1863; and Lieutenant General William J. Hardee's Corps, Army of Tennessee, November 12, 1863–November 27, 1863.

Wilson's brigade was attached to General Joseph E. Johnston's forces attempting to relieve the Siege of Vicksburg Mississippi in early 1863 and later in defending Jackson, Mississippi. After the fall of Vicksburg, Wilson's brigade went to Georgia where they were part of the reserve corps at the Battle of Chickamauga. Wilson's distinguished conduct at that battle in initiating a counterattack when Union Army troops had driven back Confederate cavalry under Major General Nathan Bedford Forrest early on the second day of the battle and in capturing several artillery pieces helped win the battle for the Confederates. That conduct resulted in recommendations that Wilson be promoted to the grade of brigadier general.

Claudius C. Wilson was appointed brigadier general on November 16, 1863, but his promotion was not confirmed by the Confederate Senate and his commission had not been delivered to him before he died of "camp fever", now generally recognized as typhus, on November 27, 1863, at Ringgold, Georgia. The Confederate Senate confirmed Wilson's appointment posthumously on February 17, 1864.

== Burial ==
Claudius Charles Wilson was buried at Bonaventure Cemetery, Savannah, Georgia.

== See also ==
- List of American Civil War generals (Confederate)
