= Rice E. Graves =

American artillery officer (1838–1863)

Rice Evan Graves, Jr.
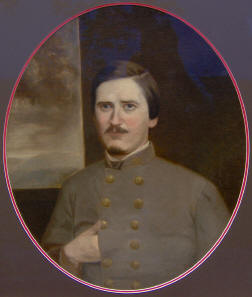
- Major Graves portrait, 1862
- Born: June 23, 1838; Rockbridge, Virginia
- Died: September 20, 1863 (aged 25); Ringgold, Tennessee
- Military career
- Allegiance: Confederate States of America
- Branch: Confederate States Army
- Service years: 1861–1863
- Rank: Major
- Unit: 2nd Kentucky Infantry
- Commands: Graves' Battery; Artillery Btln, Breckinridge's Division
- Conflicts: American Civil War: Battle of Fort Donelson; Battle of Shiloh; Siege of Vicksburg; Battle of Stones River; Battle of Jackson, MS; Battle of Chickamauga †

Rice Evan Graves Jr. (June 23, 1838 – September 20, 1863) was an artillery officer in the Confederate States Army during the American Civil War. He was killed in the Battle of Chickamauga.

== Early years ==
Graves was born in Rockbridge, Virginia but grew up near Yelvington, Daviess County, Kentucky (12 miles east of Owensboro, Kentucky) after a near tragedy in 1844 interrupted his family's planned move to St. Louis. His parents, wealthy planter Rice E. Graves Sr. and his wife Amelia Rucker Gregory (widowed daughter of American Revolutionary War Patriot Cpt. Jesee Richeson), had booked passage on the riverboat "Star of the West". With their family and all their worldly possessions on board, they began the journey down the Ohio River to Missouri and a new life. Just below Breckinridge County, Kentucky, the "Star of the West" collided with the "Hark-Away" and sank. The frantic parents saved themselves and their eight children. However, everything they owned was lost. They decided to remain in Cloverport, where the father rented a farm.

When they were financially able, the family moved to Daviess County where they to purchased land and improved it. By that time, the number of children in the household had increased to eleven and with so large a family, education opportunities were limited. All of the children were expected to help out with the farm work, so their schooling was done locally. The young Graves spent three semesters at the Owensboro Academy.

== West Point cadet ==
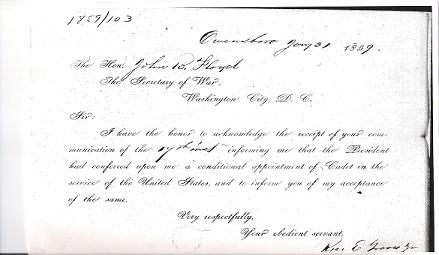
Copy of the official document by Rice E. Graves Jr., accepting his West Point appointment in 1859.

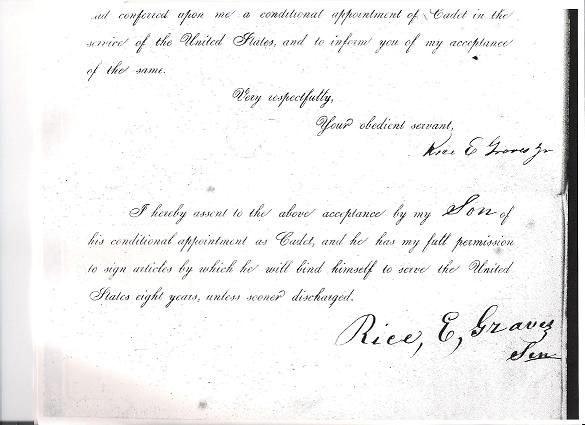
Copy of the official document by Rice E. Graves Sr., granting his permission for his son to attend the military academy.

Rice E. Graves was a cadet at the United States Military Academy at West Point, New York through a scholarship presented by Congressman Samuel O. Peyton representing the second Congressional district of Kentucky. A member of the class of 1863, he resigned his presidential appointment in 1861 to join the Confederate States of America Army. The two years he spent in West Point set the standard for his later military career.

== Confederate States Army ==
Graves enlistment in the 2nd Kentucky Infantry at Camp Boone, Tennessee, quickly becoming the regimental adjutant. In November 1861 he was promoted to captain and appointed to command Graves' Battery, an artillery unit attached to the regiment. Gaining a reputation as skillful artillery leader he was promoted to the rank of major in October 1862. He served as the divisional chief of artillery under the command of General John C. Breckinridge. Graves served in many civil war battles and campaigns to include the battle at Fort Donelson, TN, Battle of Shiloh; Siege of Vicksburg; Battle of Stones River at Murfreesboro, TN (where he was twice wounded) and the Battle of Jackson, MS.

== Death ==
Graves was mortally wounded in action at the Battle of Chickamauga on September 20, 1863. He was taken to the hospital, about one-half acre of open ground, and then moved to a house near Reed's Creek with other severely wounded men. He was dead the next morning.

He was buried in the Citizen's Cemetery in Ringgold. The exact burial location of Maj. Graves was lost.

General John C. Breckinridge wrote of Major Graves in his official report of the battle: "One member of my staff I cannot thank; Major Rice Graves received a mortal wound on the (Sunday morning)(September) 20th (1863). Although a very young man he gave promise of the highest distinction. A truer friend, a purer patriot, a better soldier, never lived".

== Tribute ==
On September 21, 1900, the Breckinridge Chapter of the Owensboro, KY UDC unveiled the first Confederate monument by the organization in Kentucky. C.H. Todd, Commander of the Rice E. Graves United Confederate Veterans Camp #1121 said that he "could recall no other soldier that he met during the war who so impressed him and so rapidly won his confidence and friendship." A military grave marker for Major Graves was erected on the anniversary of his death in 1996 by members of the General Ben Hardin Helm Sons of Confederate Veterans Camp in the center of the Ringgold cemetery.

== See also ==
- Graves' Battery
- Orphan Brigade
- Kentucky in the Civil War
