= Zachariah C. Deas =

Zachariah Cantey Deas
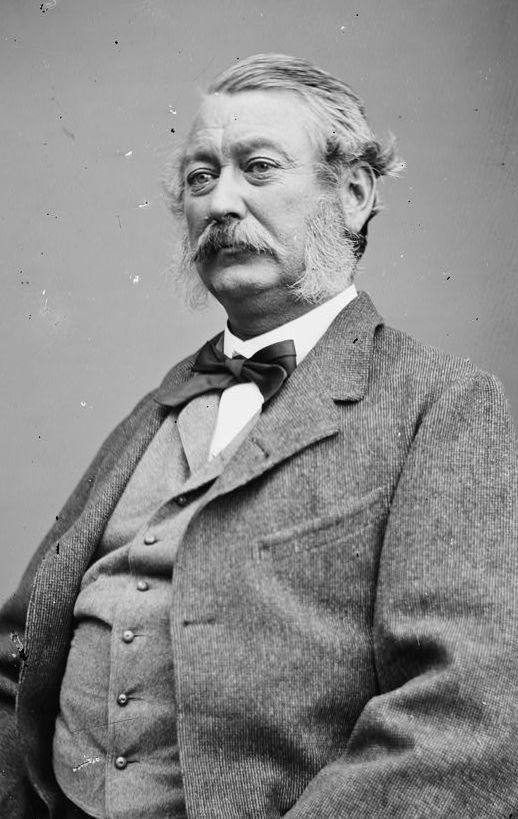
- Born: October 25, 1819; Camden, South Carolina, U.S.
- Died: March 6, 1882 (aged 62); New York City, New York, U.S.
- Burial place: Woodlawn Cemetery; The Bronx, New York, U.S.
- Military career
- Allegiance: United States; Confederate States of America
- Branch: United States Army; Confederate States Army
- Service years: 1846–1848 (USA); 1861–1865 (CSA)
- Rank: Brigadier General (CSA)
- Commands: 22nd Alabama Infantry Regiment; Deas' Brigade
- Conflicts: Mexican-American War; American Civil War

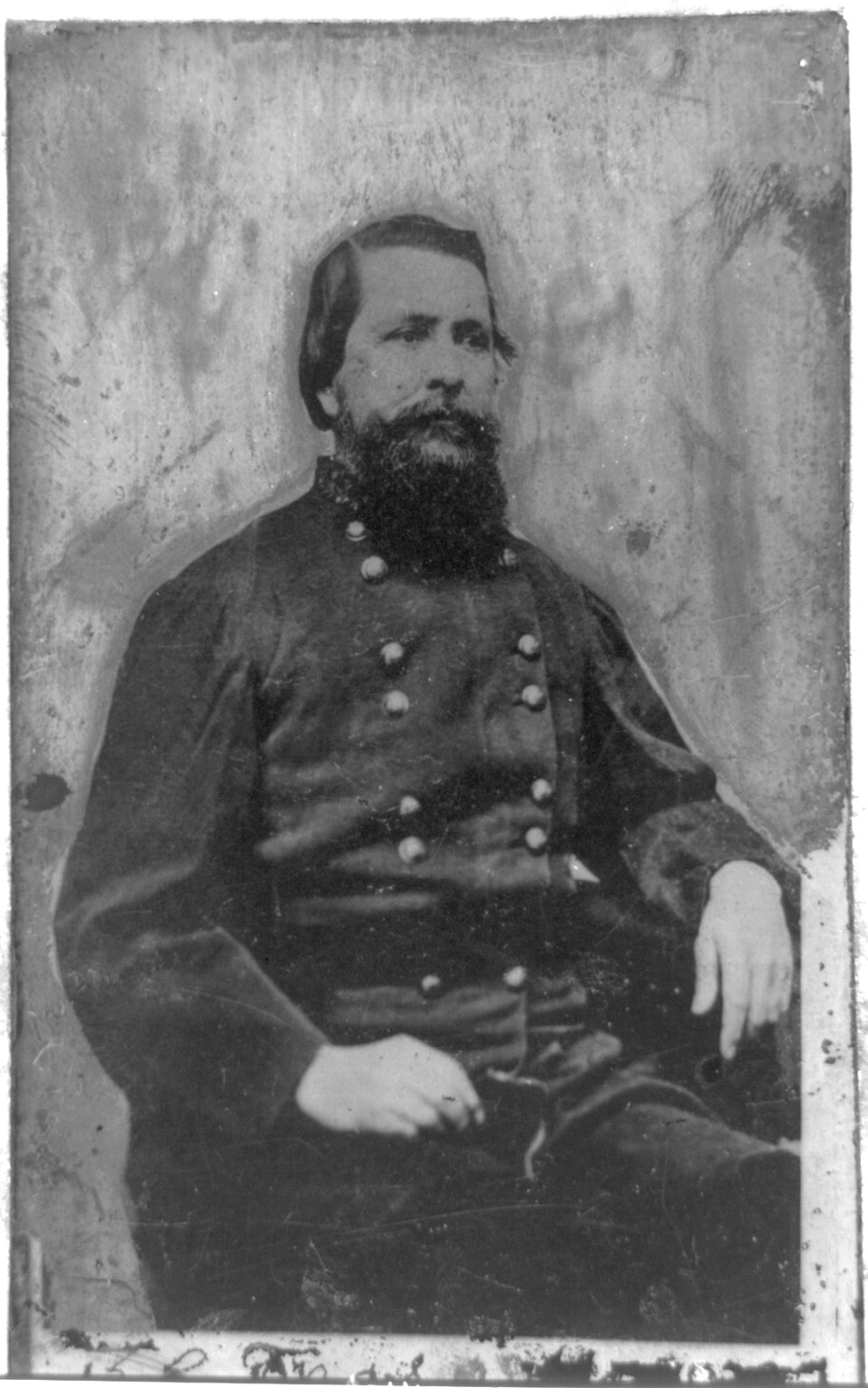
Zachariah C. Deas in the Civil War

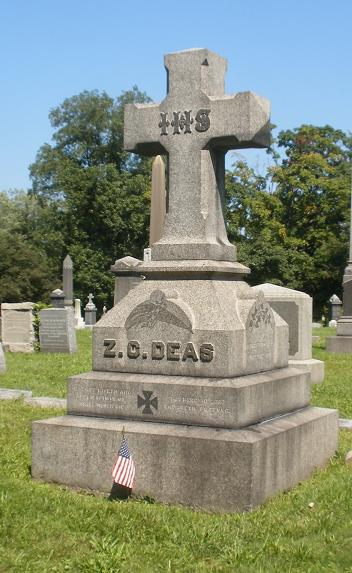
Grave monument for General Deas, Woodlawn Cemetery, Bronx

Zachariah Cantey Deas (October 25, 1819 – March 6, 1882) was an American cotton broker and military officer. He served as a brigadier general in the Confederate States Army during the American Civil War.

== Biography ==
Deas was born in Camden, South Carolina, a son of James Sutherland Deas and Margaret Rebecca (Chesnut) Deas. He was a cousin of future fellow Confederate general James Chesnut Jr. He was educated in South Carolina and in Caudebec, France. In 1835, his family moved to Mobile, Alabama, where he initially engaged in the mercantile business. He served in the army during the Mexican-American War. After the war, he became a prominent cotton broker in Alabama and amassed a significant fortune from his speculation. He married Helen Gaines Lyon on May 16, 1853. She was a grandniece of Edmund P. Gaines and George S. Gaines and lived to be 100 years old. Her sister was married to a son of Leonidas Polk.

With the passage of Alabama's ordinance of secession, Deas enlisted in the Confederate army in the Alabama Volunteer Infantry. He served as aide-de-camp to General Joseph E. Johnston during the First Battle of Manassas. He was commissioned as colonel of the 22nd Alabama, a regiment he helped raise and equip, purchasing 800 Enfield rifles with gold. He led his men at the Battle of Shiloh, where he assumed command of the brigade on the first day of fighting before falling with a severe wound the following day.

After recovering. he commanded a brigade under General Braxton Bragg in the Kentucky Campaign. His command consisted of the 19th Alabama, 22nd Alabama, 25th Alabama, 39th Alabama, 50th Alabama, 17th Alabama Battalion Sharpshooters, and Dent's Alabama Battery. He was appointed as a brigadier general on December 13, 1862, and fought at the Battle of Chickamauga, where his men routed the Union division of Philip H. Sheridan and killed Brig. Gen. William H. Lytle. They also captured seventeen artillery pieces.

Deas continued to lead his brigade through the Atlanta campaign and the subsequent fighting in Tennessee, where he was again wounded at the Battle of Franklin. He participated in the Carolinas campaign, but took ill at Raleigh, North Carolina, in March 1865 and had to leave his field command prior to the surrender at Bennett Place.

After the war, Deas returned to his cotton brokerage. He owned a seat on the New York Stock Exchange.

Deas is buried in Woodlawn Cemetery in The Bronx, New York City.

== See also ==
- List of American Civil War generals (Confederate)
