= 1st Louisiana Cavalry Regiment (Confederate) =

- Flag of Louisiana, 1861
- Active: September 11, 1861 – May 5, 1865
- Country: Confederate States of America
- Allegiance: Louisiana
- Branch: Confederate States Army
- Type: Cavalry regiment
- Size: 900 (initially)
- Organized at: Baton Rouge, Louisiana
- Engagements: American Civil War: Corinth Campaign; Confederate Heartland Offensive; Stones River Campaign; Pegram's Kentucky Raid; Tullahoma Campaign; Chickamauga Campaign; Chattanooga campaign; Knoxville Campaign; Louisiana Defensive Operations

Commanders
- Notable commanders: Col. John S. Scott

The 1st Louisiana Cavalry Regiment, also known as Scott's Cavalry Regiment, was a cavalry regiment from Louisiana that served in the Confederate States Army during the American Civil War. Raised in 1861, it served in many battles of the Western Theater until the Confederate surrender in 1865.

== History ==
The 1st Louisiana Cavalry was organized at Baton Rouge on September 11, 1861. During the Confederate invasion of Kentucky, the regiment was sent to Bowling Green and assigned to the command of General Albert Sidney Johnston. Following occupation duty over the winter, in April 1862 the 1st Louisiana fought at the Battle of Shiloh under the command of General Nathan Bedford Forrest and fought skirmishes in Alabama and Tennessee later that spring and summer.

During the Confederate Heartland Offensive, the 1st Louisiana joined Confederate forces led by General Edmund Kirby Smith during his invasion of Kentucky. The regiment captured the state capitol of Frankfort on September 3, and fought at Mumfordville, Perryville, and Murfreesboro, but the Confederates were later forced to withdraw and did not regain control of Kentucky for the remainder of the war.

The 1st Louisiana took part in further raids and skirmishes in Tennessee and Kentucky, and fought under General Forrest's cavalry corps at the Battle of Chickamauga in September, 1863. In 1864 the regiment moved into Mississippi and Louisiana, launching unsuccessful attempts to dislodge occupying Union forces there. The remaining troops of the 1st Louisiana surrendered at Columbus, Mississippi at the end of the war.

The commander of the regiment, Colonel John S. Scott, got into difficulties with his fellow officers and was court-martialed several times over the course of the war. He was able to evade punishment until he was relieved of his command in March 1865 for unauthorized contraband trading.

== Commanders ==
Commanders of the 1st Louisiana Cavalry Regiment:

- Col. John S. Scott, dismissed March 7, 1865.
- Lt. Col. J.O. Nixon

== Organization ==
Companies of the 1st Louisiana Cavalry Regiment:

- Company A - Ed Moore Rangers – (Iberville Parish)
- Company B - Baton Rouge Rangers – (East Baton Rouge Parish)
- Company C - (West Feliciana Parish)
- Company D - Rapides Rangers – (Rapides Parish)
- Company E - Jackson Mounted Men – (East Feliciana Parish)
- Company F - (Concordia Parish)
- Company G - Creole Chargers – (Avoyelles Parish)
- Company H - (East Baton Rouge Parish)
- Company I - Morgan Rangers – (Pointe Coupee Parish)
- Company K - Louisiana Dragoons – (Catahoula Parish)
- Regimental Howitzer Company - Robinson's Louisiana Horse Artillery

== See also ==
- List of Louisiana Confederate Civil War units
