= Marcellus Augustus Stovall =

Confederate general (1819–1895)

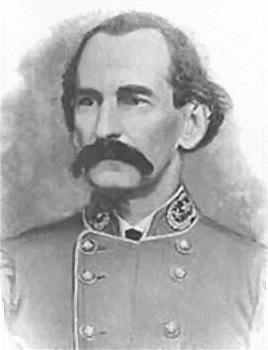
- Born: September 18, 1818; Sparta, Georgia
- Died: August 4, 1895 (aged 76); Augusta, Georgia
- Burial place: Magnolia Cemetery, Augusta
- Military career
- Allegiance: United States of America; Confederate States of America
- Branch: Confederate States Army
- Service years: 1861 – 65
- Rank: Brigadier General
- Conflicts: American Civil War

Marcellus Augustus Stovall (September 18, 1818 – August 4, 1895) was an American soldier and merchant. He served as a Confederate general during the American Civil War. After the war, he resumed business and civil interests.

== Early life and career ==
Marcellus A. Stovall was born in 1818 within the city of Sparta located in Hancock County, Georgia. He was the son of Pleasant Stovall, a successful merchant from Augusta. Stovall received his initial education at Wesleyan Academy in Wilbraham, Massachusetts, and then he returned home and enlisted as a private in the Georgia State volunteers in 1835. He served in the Richmond Blues (mounted infantry militia) during the Seminole Wars and was mustered out in 1837.

Stovall entered the United States Military Academy at West Point on July 1, 1836, but resigned a year later in 1837 due to poor health. In 1839 he toured Europe, and then he became a merchant and served in the Georgia State Militia as a captain of artillery, serving with the Clinch Rifles. Stovall married Sarah G. McKinne in 1842, and he moved to an estate near Rome, located in Floyd County in 1846, where he was again a merchant and a militia captain, serving with the Cherokee Volunteer Artillery.

== Civil War service ==
At the beginning of the American Civil War in 1861, Stovall chose to follow his home state and the Confederate cause. He was appointed colonel of the 2nd Artillery Regiment in the Georgia forces in August, and entered the Confederate Army as a lieutenant colonel in the 3rd Georgia Battalion, which was assigned to the Confederate Capital of Richmond, Virginia. Stovall then served at Lynchburg, Goldsboro, North Carolina, and in eastern Tennessee. He first saw combat in 1862 at Waldren's Ridge, and then accompanied Maj. Gen. Edmund Kirby Smith into Kentucky and the Trans-Mississippi Department.

Following the Kentucky Campaign from June to October 1862, Stovall was ordered to join Gen. Braxton Bragg's Army of Tennessee, and fought during the Battle of Stones River from December 31 to January 2, 1863. He was promoted to the rank of brigadier general on January 20, 1863. His brigade was assigned to Maj. Gen. John C. Breckinridge's Division in D.H. Hill's II Corps from June 6 to November 12. His brigade participated in the Siege of Jackson in Mississippi on May 14.

Stovall's command fought in the Western Theater actions of Battle of Chickamauga in September 1863, and the Atlanta campaign throughout 1864. He was "warmly commended" by Breckinridge for his performance during the Battle of Chickamauga. After the fall of Atlanta on September 2, 1864, Stovall and his brigade (now part of Clayton's Division) fought in the Franklin-Nashville Campaign that fall and then the Carolinas campaign in 1865 with what was left of the Army of Tennessee.

Stovall surrendered his command with Gen. Joseph E. Johnston's army in North Carolina, in the spring of 1865, and he was paroled on May 9.

== Postbellum ==
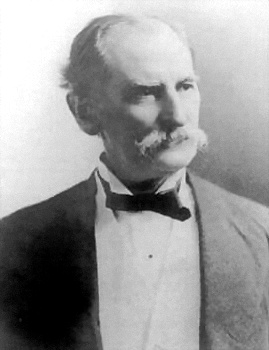
Stovall in later life

After the American Civil War ended in 1865, Stovall worked as a cotton broker, then became a merchant of farming supplies. Later he organized and became manager of the Georgia Chemical Works, engaging in the manufacture of fertilizers.

Stovall served as a city alderman and then police commissioner of Augusta, and was quite active in the Confederate Survivors Association. In 1878 he married for the second time to Courtney Augusta Peck. Stovall died in 1895 at the age of 76 in Augusta, Georgia, and was buried there in Magnolia Cemetery.

== See also ==
- List of American Civil War generals (Confederate)
