= Missionary Ridge =

Geographic feature in Chattanooga, Tennessee, United States

Coordinates: 34°59′11″N 85°16′43″W

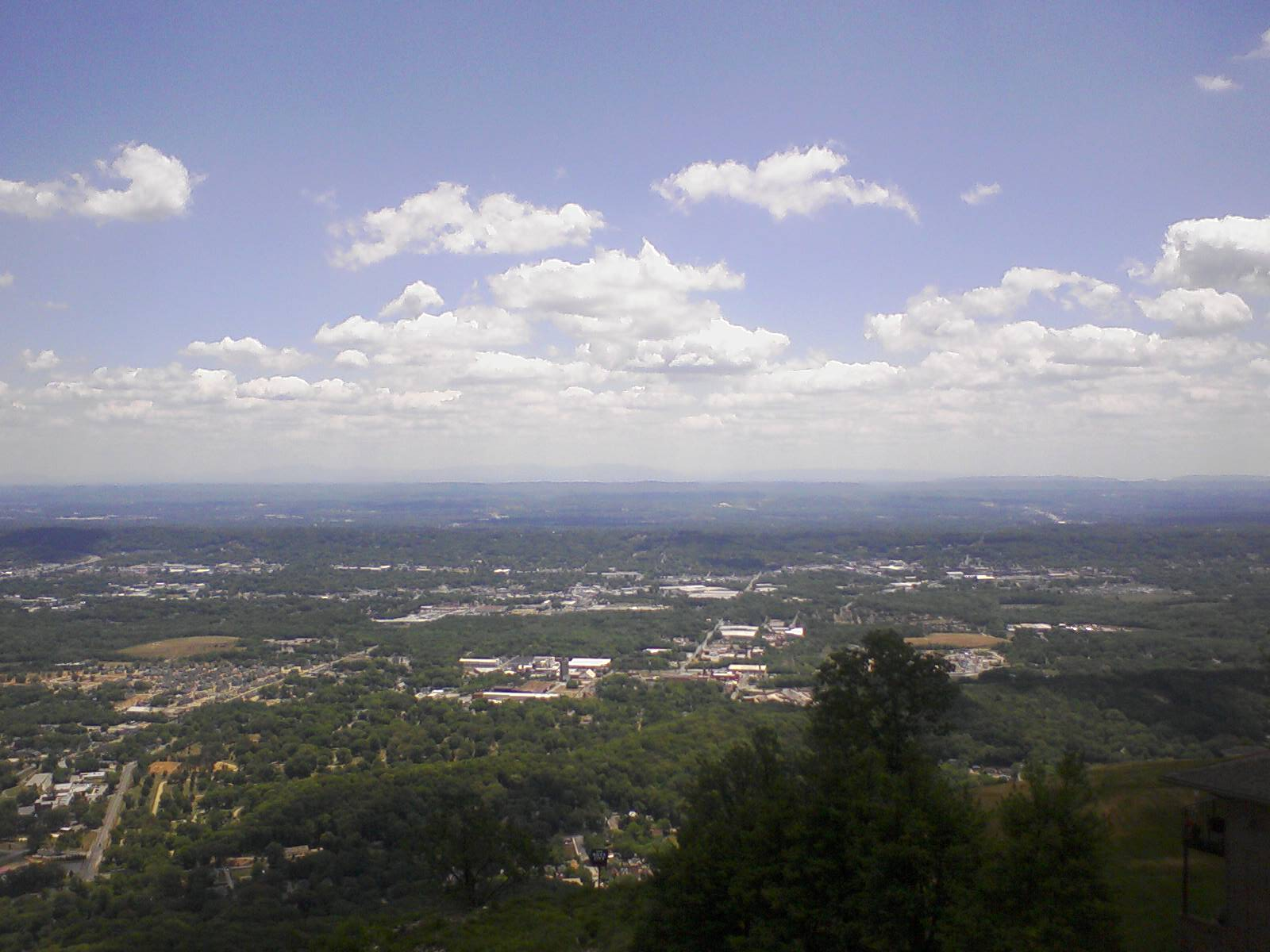
Missionary Ridge, as viewed from Lookout Mountain. The ridge is the sharp divide in the middle of the picture. The Smoky Mountains are in the far background.

Missionary Ridge is a geographic feature in Chattanooga, Tennessee, site of the Battle of Missionary Ridge, a battle in the American Civil War, fought on November 25, 1863. Union forces under Maj. Gens. Ulysses S. Grant, William T. Sherman, and George H. Thomas routed Confederate forces under General Braxton Bragg and lifted the siege of the city.

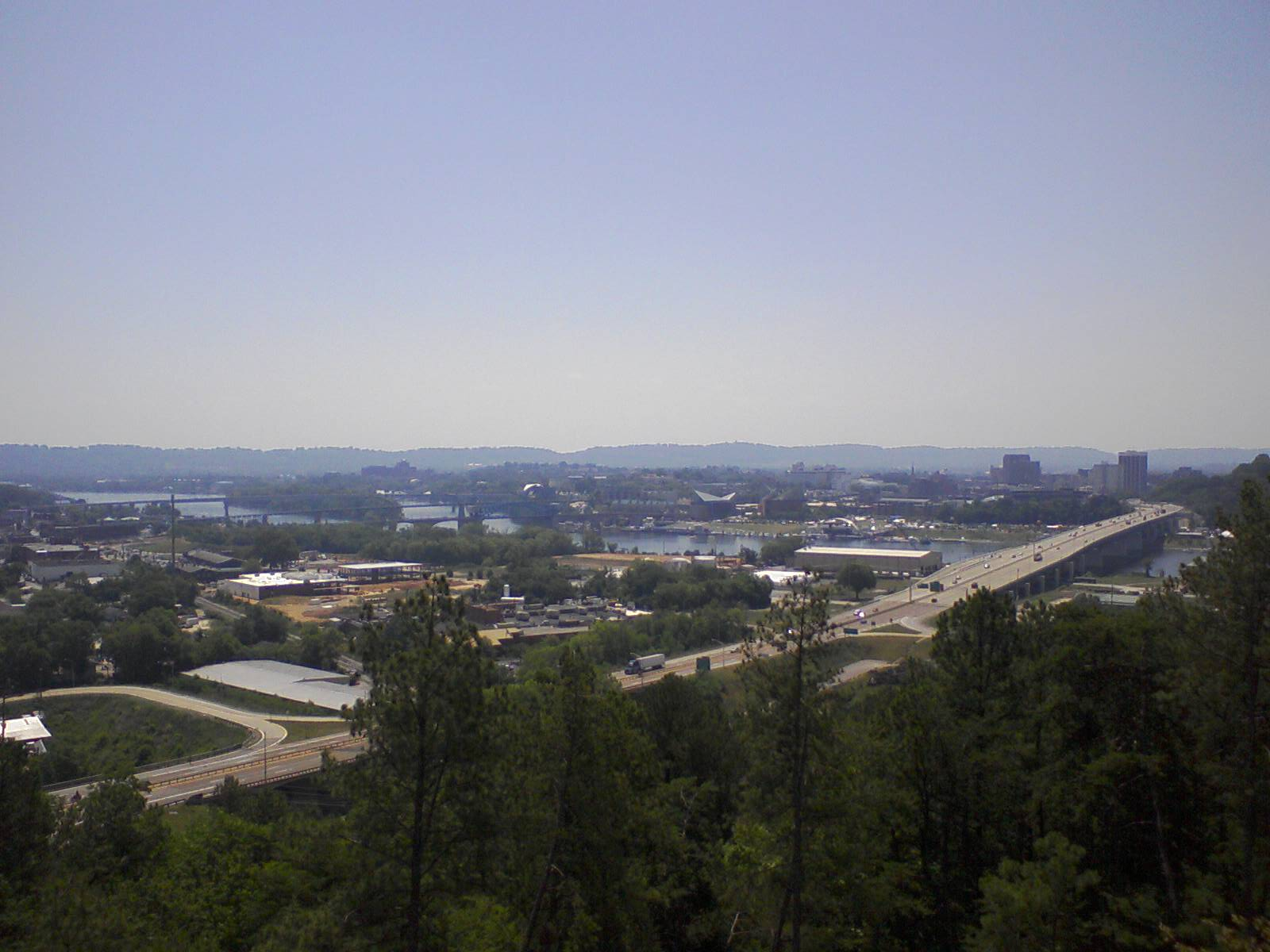
Missionary Ridge surrounds downtown Chattanooga; the "Ridge Cut", a 1/4-mile (0.40 km) blast into the ridge to pass Interstate 24, is the dip in the center of the image.

Missionary Ridge runs basically north–south for several miles and varies in width from a few feet to over 660 feet (200 m), with very steep, nearly vertical sides that rise over 330 feet (100 m) from the ground surrounding it. Missionary Ridge was so named for the early missionaries who made their way along paths climbing the ridge on their way to Brainerd Village to the settlement of the Cherokee. It was also referred to as "Mission Ridge" in the early years.

Like many areas in the South, Missionary Ridge has a kudzu infestation. The city of Chattanooga has undertaken a trial program using goats and llamas that graze on the plant. In 2007, the goats grazed along the Missionary Ridge area in the east of the city.
