= William H. T. Walker =

American soldier (1816-1864)

William H.T. Walker
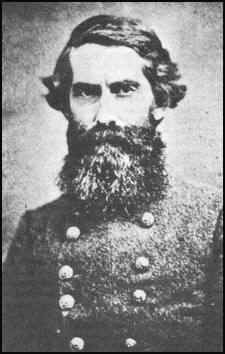
- Born: November 26, 1816; Augusta, Georgia
- Died: July 22, 1864 (aged 47); Atlanta, Georgia
- Burial place: Walker Cemetery, Georgia
- Military career
- Allegiance: United States of America; Confederate States of America
- Branch: United States Army; Confederate States Army
- Service years: 1837–1838, 1840–1860 (USA); 1861–1864 (CSA)
- Rank: Major (USA); Major General (CSA)
- Nicknames: Shot Pouch, Fighting Billy
- Commands: 1st Division, Georgia Militia; Walker's Division; Reserve Corps, Army of Tennessee
- Conflicts: 2nd Seminole War: Battle of Lake Okeechobee; Mexican-American War: Battle of Contreras; Battle of Churubusco; Battle of Molino del Rey; American Civil War: Battle of Chickamauga; Atlanta campaign; Battle of Kennesaw Mountain; Battle of Atlanta †

William Henry Talbot Walker (November 26, 1816 – July 22, 1864) was an American soldier. He was a career United States Army officer who fought with distinction during the Mexican-American War, and also served as a Confederate general during the American Civil War. Walker was severely wounded many times in combat, and was killed in action during the 1864 Atlanta campaign.

== Early life and career ==
William Henry Talbot Walker (often styled as William H.T. or W.H.T. Walker to distinguish him from the other two William Walkers in the Confederate Army) was born in Augusta, Georgia in 1816. He was a son of Freeman Walker (a U.S. Senator and Augusta mayor) and his wife Mary Garlington Creswell; however his father died in 1827 when he was ten years old. Walker then received his early education at Augusta's Richmond Academy. He would have four children with his wife Mary Townsend, two sons and two daughters.

Walker entered the United States Military Academy at West Point in 1832, and graduated four years later, standing 46th out of 59 cadets. Walker was appointed a brevet second lieutenant on July 1, 1837, and assigned to the 6th U.S. Infantry. On July 31 he was promoted to the rank of second lieutenant. That winter he was serving in Lake Okeechobee, Florida, where he was seriously wounded on December 25 in the neck, shoulder, chest, left arm, and also his leg. Walker was appointed a brevet first lieutenant to rank from that day as well. He was promoted to first lieutenant on February 1, 1838, and would resign his commission on October 31 of that year.

Walker was reinstated in the U.S. Army as a first lieutenant on November 18, 1840, to rank from his last promotion in early 1838. He was again assigned to the 6th U.S. Infantry, and was promoted to captain on November 7, 1845.

During the Mexican-American War, he fought at the Battle of Contreras and the Battle of Churubusco, both in August 1847. While engaged at Churubusco he was again wounded, and his performance there combined with his actions at Contreras won him brevet to the rank of major on August 20. Walker then participated in the Battle of Molino del Rey in early September and was once more wounded, this time in the back. For his actions there he was made a brevet lieutenant colonel on September 8.

After the war with Mexico concluded, Walker was on recruiting duty for the U.S. Army from 1849 to 1852. Walker served as commandant of the cadets at West Point from July 31, 1854, to May 22, 1856. Also during his time at West Point he taught military tactics and was promoted to major in the 10th U.S. Infantry on March 3, 1855. His nickname of "Shot Pouch" was due to his multiple woundings.

In 1860, he owned 14 slaves in Richmond County, Georgia. They lived in 5 slave houses. His mother Mary Creswell Walker at the time of that census owned 26 slaves in 9 slave houses.

== Civil War service ==
With the outbreak of the American Civil War, Walker chose to follow his home state of Georgia and the Confederate cause. He resigned his commission on December 20, 1860, and was appointed a colonel in the Georgia state militia on February 1, 1861. He would hold this position until March 13, when he was appointed a major general in the 1st Division, Georgia Militia, until May.

Walker transferred to the Confederate Army infantry as a colonel on April 25. He was promoted to brigadier general on May 25 and assigned the 1st brigade, 4th Division of the Potomac District of the Department of Northern Virginia on October 22. Seven days later he resigned his commission, either due to his health or from dissatisfaction with his military assignments. Almost immediately after resigning, Walker served in the Georgia militia again as a brigadier general from November 1861 to January 1863, when he resigned to re-enter the Confederate States Army.

Walker resumed his brigadier general rank in the Confederate Army on February 9, 1863, and in May was assigned to brigade command to the Confederate Department of the West. On May 21 he was given divisional command in the same department, and he was promoted to major general on May 23. This promotion was strongly endorsed by the department's commander, Gen. Joseph E. Johnston, who considered Walker "the only officer in his command competent to lead a division." Walker then participated in the Vicksburg Campaign that summer in Johnston's command. Walker and his division were transferred to the Department of Mississippi & Eastern Louisiana in July and served there until August 23, when his command was added to the Reserve Corps of the Army of Tennessee until November 4. During this time Walker fought in the Confederate victory at the Battle of Chickamauga in Georgia that September as commander of that corps.

Death

Preceding his death he met with his cousin Elizabeth Talbot Belt:

"About a week before the battle of Atlanta was fought, I met GENERAL WALKER in Augusta and he gave me a large photo of himself; said he had three taken, one for his mother, one for his wife, and one for his favorite cousin, myself. In parting he said: "Goodbye, I shall never see you again." I asked him why. He said, "When Atlanta is taken, which it will be, Georgia will fall, and I will die with Georgia." Like a knight of olden times, worthy of the race he sprang from, "he died for Georgia." "Forte et fidele" was engraved on the banner borne by Richard de Talbot at the battle of Hastings in the year 1006. He was a young Norman knight, a gentleman swordsman of William the Conqueror, Shakespeare, in his "Henry VI," has immortalized the Great John Talbot, first earl of Shrewsbury. The greatest warrior of his age he lived in, was killed at Chatillon, a town in France, at the age of 80, fighting for England. ELIZABETH TALBOT BELT."

In December 1863, Walker and his division were made part of Lt. Gen. William J. Hardee's First Corps of the Army of Tennessee. He would command it up to his death in combat on July 22, 1864, at the Battle of Atlanta, when he was shot from his horse by a Federal picket, killing him instantly, and Brig. Gen. Hugh W. Mercer took over the division. Walker is buried in the Walker Cemetery, located at Augusta University in Georgia.

== In memory ==
An upturned cannon waymark in the Glenwood Avenue triangle of Atlanta currently marks the place where Walker was killed. Its front description plate reads: "In memory of Maj.Gen. William H.T. Walker, C.S.A." and the rear plate reads: "Born November 26, 1816; killed on this spot July 22, 1864."

A bronze bust of Walker was dedicated in 1916, made by American sculptor Theo Alice Ruggles Kitson, and is located at Vicksburg National Military Park.

Fort Walker and Walker High School, also in Atlanta, was named in his honor. However, Walker High School's name was changed in 1987 to "McNair High School" to honor astronaut Ronald E. McNair, who died in the Challenger Space Shuttle explosion the prior year.

== See also ==
- List of American Civil War generals (Confederate)
