= Battle of Jonesborough order of battle: Confederate =

Units in the 1864 battle

The following Confederate Army units and commanders fought in the Battle of Jonesborough of the American Civil War on August 31-September 1, 1864. The Union order of battle is listed separately.

See also: Atlanta Campaign Confederate order of battle (second phase) and Atlanta Confederate order of battle.

== Abbreviations used ==
=== Military rank ===
- MG = Major General
- BG = Brigadier General
- Col = Colonel
- Ltc = Lieutenant Colonel
- Maj = Major
- Cpt = Captain
- Lt = Lieutenant

=== Other ===
- w = wounded
- mw = mortally wounded
- k = killed
- c = captured
- mia = Missing in action

== Army of Tennessee ==
LTG William J. Hardee

=== Hardee's Corps ===
MG Patrick R. Cleburne

Division	Brigade	Regiments and Others
Cheatham's Division BG George E. Maney; BG John C. Carter	Maney's Brigade Col George C. Porter	4th Confederate (34th Tennessee); 1st-27th Tennessee; 6th-9th Tennessee: Col George C. Porter; 19th Tennessee; 50th Tennessee: Col Stephen H. Colms
Cheatham's Division BG George E. Maney; BG John C. Carter	Strahl's Brigade Col James D. Tillman	4th-5th Tennessee; 24th Tennessee: Ltc Samuel E. Shannon; 31st Tennessee; 33rd Tennessee; 41st Tennessee: Cpt A.M. Keith
Cheatham's Division BG George E. Maney; BG John C. Carter	Wright's Brigade BG John C. Carter	8th Tennessee; 16th Tennessee; 28th Tennessee; 38th Tennessee: Maj Hamilton W. Cotter; 51st-52nd Tennessee
Cheatham's Division BG George E. Maney; BG John C. Carter	Gist's Brigade Col Ellison Capers	46th Georgia; 65th Georgia; 16th South Carolina: Col James McCullough, Cpt John W. Boling; 24th South Carolina: Ltc Jesse S. Jones; 8th Georgia Battalion: Ltc Zachariah L. Watters; 2nd Georgia Sharpshooter Battalion
Cheatham's Division BG George E. Maney; BG John C. Carter	Vaughn's Brigade Col Michael Magevney	11th Tennessee: Col George W. Gordon; 12th-47th Tennessee: Col William M. Watkins; 13th-154th (Senior) Tennessee: Maj William J. Crook; 29th Tennessee: Col Horace Rice
Cleburne's Division BG Mark P. Lowrey	Govan's Brigade BG Daniel C. Govan (c); Col Peter V. Green	1st-15th Arkansas: Cpt Felix G. Lusk (mia); Capt William H. Scales; 2nd-24th Arkansas: Maj Amzi T. Meek (mia); Capt John K. Phillips; 5th-13th Arkansas: Col Peter V. Green; Ltc E. A. Howell; 6th-7th Arkansas: Col Samuel G. Smith (mw&c); Cpt J.T. Robinson; 8th-19th Arkansas: Maj David H. Hamiter; 3rd Confederate: Capt Mumford H. Dixon (c)
Cleburne's Division BG Mark P. Lowrey	Mercer's Brigade Col Charles H. Olmstead	1st (Olmstead's) Georgia Volunteers: Maj Martin J. Ford; 54th Georgia: Ltc Morgan Rawls, Cpt Thomas W. Brantley; 57th Georgia: Col William Barkuloo, Ltc Cincinnatus S. Guyton; 63rd Georgia
Cleburne's Division BG Mark P. Lowrey	Lowrey's Brigade Col John Weir	16th Alabama; 33rd Alabama; 45th Alabama: Ltc Robert H. Abercrombie; 5th Mississippi & 3rd Mississippi Battalion: Col John Weir; 8th & 32nd Mississippi: Cpt Andrew Moody
Cleburne's Division BG Mark P. Lowrey	Granbury's Brigade BG Hiram B. Granbury	5th Confederate (Tennessee): Capt Aaron A. Cox; 6th Texas Infantry-15th Texas Cavalry (dismounted); Capt Matthew M. Houston; 7th Texas: Capt J. William Brown; 10th Texas Infantry: Ltc Robert B. Young; 17th-18th Texas Cavalry (dismounted): Capt William H. Perry; 24th-25th Texas Cavalry (dismounted): Maj. William A. Taylor
Bate's Division MG John C. Brown	Tyler's Brigade BG Thomas Benton Smith	37th Georgia; 2nd Tennessee; 10th Tennessee; 15th-37th Tennessee: Cpt Matthew Dwyer; 20th Tennessee; 30th Tennessee; 4th Georgia Sharpshooter Battalion
Bate's Division MG John C. Brown	Lewis' (Orphan) Brigade BG Joseph Horace Lewis	2nd Kentucky: Col James W. Moss (mw); 4th Kentucky; 5th Kentucky; 6th Kentucky: Col Martin H. Cofer; 9th Kentucky
Bate's Division MG John C. Brown	Jackson's Brigade BG Henry R. Jackson	1st Confederate (Georgia Volunteers); 25th Georgia: Col William J. Winn, Maj A.W. Smith; 29th Georgia; 30th Georgia; 66th Georgia: Cpt Thomas L. Langston; 1st Georgia Sharpshooter Battalion
Bate's Division MG John C. Brown	Finley's Brigade BG Jesse J. Finley (w) Ltc Daniel Kenan	1st-3rd Florida; 1st Florida Cavalry (dismounted)-4th Florida Infantry; 6th Florida: Ltc Daniel Kenan; 7th Florida
Hardee's Corps Artillery Col Melancthon Smith	Palmer's Battalion Maj Joseph Palmer	Lumsden's (Alabama) Battery; Anderson's (Georgia) Battery; Havis' (Georgia) Battery
Hardee's Corps Artillery Col Melancthon Smith	Hoxton's Battalion Maj Llewelyn Hoxton	Phelan's (Alabama) Battery; Marion (Florida) Light Artillery; Turner's (Mississippi) Battery
Hardee's Corps Artillery Col Melancthon Smith	Hotchkiss' Battalion Maj Thomas R. Hotchkiss Cpt Thomas Key	Semple's (Alabama) Battery; Key's (Arkansas) Battery: Cpt Thomas Key; Warren (Mississippi) Light Artillery
Hardee's Corps Artillery Col Melancthon Smith	Martin's Battalion Maj Robert Martin	Howell's (Georgia) Battery; Bledsoe's (Missouri) Battery; Ferguson's (South Carolina) Battery
Hardee's Corps Artillery Col Melancthon Smith	Cobb's Battalion Maj Robert Cobb	Cobb's (Kentucky) Battery; 5th Company, Washington (Louisiana) Light Artillery; Johnston (Tennessee) Light Artillery

=== Lee's Corps ===
LTG Stephen D. Lee

Division	Brigade	Regiments and Others
Anderson's Division MG Patton Anderson	Deas' Brigade BG Zachariah C. Deas	19th Alabama; 22nd Alabama: Col Benjamin R. Hart; 25th Alabama; 39th Alabama: Cpt T. J. Branon; 50th Alabama: Col John G. Coltart, Cpt George W. Arnold; 17th Alabama Sharpshooters (until mid-August)
Anderson's Division MG Patton Anderson	Manigault's Brigade BG Arthur Middleton Manigault	24th Alabama: Col Newton N. Davis; 28th Alabama; 34th Alabama: Col Julius C. B. Mitchell; 10th South Carolina: Col James F. Pressley; 19th South Carolina: Cpt Elijah W. Horne
Anderson's Division MG Patton Anderson	Brantley's Brigade Col William F. Brantley	24th-27th Mississippi: Col Robert P. McKelvaine; 29th-30th Mississippi: Col William F. Brantley, Ltc James M. Johnson; 34th Mississippi: Cpt T. S. Hubbard
Anderson's Division MG Patton Anderson	Sharp's Brigade BG Jacob H. Sharp	7th Mississippi: Col William H. Bishop; 9th Mississippi; 10th Mississippi; 41st Mississippi: Col J. Byrd Williams; 44th Mississippi; 9th Mississippi Sharpshooters
Stevenson's Division MG Carter L. Stevenson	Brown's Brigade Col Joseph B. Palmer (w September 1)	3rd Tennessee (Volunteers); 18th Tennessee: Col Joseph B. Palmer; 26th Tennessee: Col Richard M. Saffell; 32nd Tennessee; 45th Tennessee-23rd Tennessee Battalion: Col Anderson Searcy
Stevenson's Division MG Carter L. Stevenson	Cumming's Brigade BG Alfred Cumming	34th Georgia; 36th Georgia; 39th Georgia; 56th Georgia: Col Elihu P. Watkins; 2nd Georgia State: Col James Wilson
Stevenson's Division MG Carter L. Stevenson	Reynold's Brigade Col Washington M. Hardy	58th North Carolina; 60th North Carolina; 54th Virginia; 63rd Virginia
Stevenson's Division MG Carter L. Stevenson	Pettus' Brigade BG Edmund W. Pettus	20th Alabama: Col James M. Dedman; 23rd Alabama; 30th Alabama: Col Charles M. Shelley; 31st Alabama; 46th Alabama
Clayton's Division MG Henry D. Clayton	Stovall's Brigade BG Marcellus A. Stovall	40th Georgia; 41st Georgia; 42nd Georgia; 43rd Georgia; 52nd Georgia; 1st Georgia State: Cpt Albert Howell
Clayton's Division MG Henry D. Clayton	Holtzclaw's Brigade BG James T. Holtzclaw	18th Alabama; 32nd-58th Alabama; 36th Alabama; 38th Alabama: Lt John C. Dumas
Clayton's Division MG Henry D. Clayton	Gibson's Brigade BG Randall L. Gibson	1st Louisiana (Regulars); 4th Louisiana; 13th Louisiana: Col Francis L. Campbell; 16th-25th Louisiana; 19th Louisiana: Col Richard W. Turner; 20th Louisiana: Col Leon Von Zinken; 30th Louisiana; 4th Louisiana Battalion; 14th Louisiana Sharpshooters
Clayton's Division MG Henry D. Clayton	Baker's Brigade BG Alpheus Baker	37th Alabama; 40th Alabama; 42nd Alabama; 54th Alabama
Lee's Corps Artillery Ltc James H. Hallonquist	William's Battalion Ltc Samuel C. Williams Cpt Reuben Kolb	Barbour (Alabama) Artillery: Cpt Reuben Kolb; Jefferson (Mississippi) Artillery; Nottoway (Virginia) Artillery
Lee's Corps Artillery Ltc James H. Hallonquist	Courtney's Battalion Maj Alfred R. Courtney	Dent's (Alabama) Battery; Garrity's (Alabama) Battery; Douglas' (Texas) Battery
Lee's Corps Artillery Ltc James H. Hallonquist	Eldridge's Battalion Maj John W. Eldridge	Eufala (Alabama) Artillery; Fenner's (Louisiana) Battery; Stanford's (Mississippi) Battery
Lee's Corps Artillery Ltc James H. Hallonquist	Johnston's Battalion Maj John W. Johnston Cpt John B. Rowan	Cherokee (Georgia) Artillery: Cpt Max van den Corput; Stephens (Georgia) Light Artillery: John B. Rowan; Marshall's (Tennessee) Battery
