= 9th Mississippi Infantry Regiment =

- Active: 1861-1865
- Disbanded: April 26, 1865
- Country: Confederate States
- Allegiance: Mississippi
- Branch: Confederate States Army
- Type: Infantry
- Size: Regiment
- Battles: American Civil War: Battle of Shiloh; Battle of Stones River; Battle of Chickamauga; Atlanta campaign; Battle of Franklin; Battle of Nashville

The 9th Mississippi Infantry Regiment was a Confederate infantry regiment from Mississippi. Organized from a group of volunteer companies at Pensacola in April 1861, the regiment was reorganized in 1862 and took part in many battles of the Western theater of the American Civil War before surrendering in April, 1865.

== "Old" 9th Mississippi ==
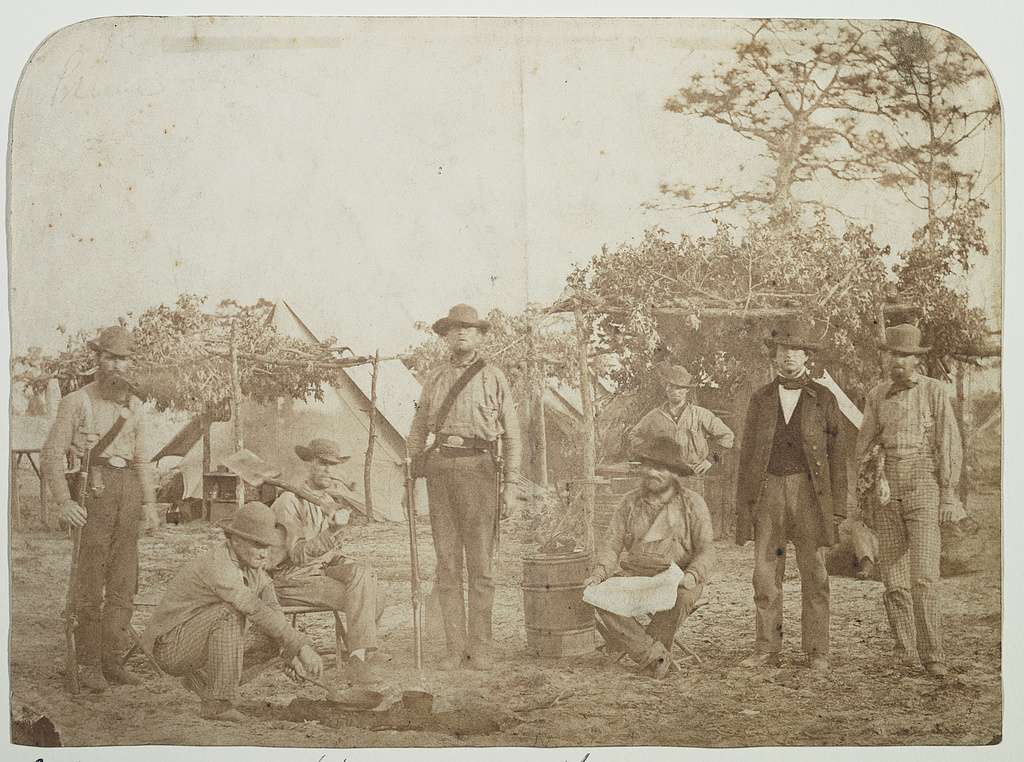
Troops of Company B, 9th Mississippi Infantry in camp at Pensacola, 1861.

The 9th Mississippi Regiment was organized from volunteer companies assembled at Pensacola, Florida in the spring of 1861. Several of these companies had formed in early 1860 and began drilling in military tactics as tensions rose prior to the 1860 Presidential Election. From the volunteers, the 9th and 10th Regiments were formed as the first Mississippi Confederate regiments on April 17, 1861, regimental numbers 1-8 being reserved for the state army. The Confederate forces at Pensacola were under the command of General Braxton Bragg, who aimed to capture federally-held forts around Pensacola bay. The 9th took part in the Battle of Santa Rosa Island in October, which was an unsuccessful attempt to capture Fort Pickens. The 9th Regiment, with a reported strength of approximately 450 men, left Pensacola in February and the Confederates evacuated the region in May 1862.

The original 12-month enlistment of volunteers expired in April, 1862, and the regiment was re-organized, with the men re-enlisting for 3 years. New companies were organized, and some troops from the "old" 9th regiment transferred to other regiments. Col. James Ronald Chalmers of the 9th was promoted to Brigadier general, and was given command of a brigade including his old regiment. The 9th was ordered to head to the Cumberland Gap, and had reached northern Alabama when they were sent back to North Mississippi to oppose Union General Ulysses S. Grant's advance through Tennessee.

== Shiloh ==
Under General Chalmers, the troops of 9th Mississippi went into battle on the morning of April 6 at Shiloh. Chalmers' advance against the Union troops commanded by General Benjamin M. Prentiss resulted in a rout of the Federal forces. Later in the day Chalmers pushed back other Union regiments, and the 14th Iowa and 18th Missouri both surrendered to the 9th Mississippi. By nightfall the Confederates had pushed the Federal forces back to Pittsburg Landing on the banks of the Tennessee River.

On the morning of April 7, the Union troops launched a counterattack, pushing back the Southern troops. Chalmers ordered his troops to charge the Northern lines, and Lt. Col. William A. Rankin of the 9th Regiment was killed in this attack. The Union troops were able to successfully advance and achieve victory. The 9th withdrew to Corinth, Mississippi after the retreat from Shiloh. In his after-action report, General Bragg wrote that: "Brigadier General James R. Chalmers, at the head of his gallant Mississippians, filled - he could not have exceeded - the measure of my expectations. Never were troops and commander more worthy of each other and of their State."

== 1862-1863 ==
The 9th Regiment under General Chalmers took part in the 1862 Kentucky Campaign, fighting at the Battle of Munfordville in September. Bragg's army then moved into Tennessee and fought at Murfreesboro December 29, 1862 - January 2, 1863. At Murfreesboro, The 9th Regiment was involved in heavy fighting at the location later known as "Hell's Half Acre", which is also sometimes referred to as the "Mississippian's Half Acre" due to the heavy casualties Chalmers' brigade took there.

In the spring of 1863, command of the brigade was reassigned to General Patton Anderson. The 9th remained in Tennessee until September when they fought at the Battle of Chickamauga in North Georgia, charging the Federal lines four times. The regiment then fought at the Battle of Missionary Ridge before retreating into Georgia.

== 1864-1865 ==
In December 1863, the 7th Mississippi and the 9th were placed under a unified command, with Lt. Col. Benjamin F. Johns leading the 9th. Johns commanded the 9th throughout the Atlanta campaign, where the regiment fought at Rocky Face Ridge, Resaca, New Hope Church, Ezra Church, and Jonesborough.

In late 1864 the 9th fought in the Franklin–Nashville campaign as part of General Jacob H. Sharp's brigade, including the Battle of Franklin and the Battle of Nashville. At Franklin, the 9th took part in a night-time assault on the Union trenches, enagaging in hand-to-hand combat with Federal troops. General Sharp was wounded in this battle and his brigade captured 3 stands of Union regimental colors. Following the defeat at Nashville on December 16, the 9th Regiment retreated to Mississippi.

The regiment was ordered to head for the Carolinas in April, 1865, but at this point Sharp's brigade had taken so many casualties that their total strength was only 420 men. The survivors of the brigade were consolidated into a single regiment: the combined 7th, 9th, 41st, and 44th Regiments along with the 9th Mississippi Battalion were designated as the 9th Regiment. This consolidated unit surrendered on April 26, 1865, in North Carolina.

== Commanders ==
Commanders of the 9th Mississippi Infantry:

- Col. James Ronald Chalmers, promoted to brigadier general, 1862.
- Col. Thomas W. White
- Col. William C. Richards (of the consolidated 9th Regiment, April 1865).
- Lt. Col. James L. Autry, transferred to 27th Mississippi, 1862.
- Lt. Col. William A. Rankin, killed at Shiloh, 1862.
- Lt. Col. F. Eugene Whitfield
- Lt. Col. Thomas H. Lynam
- Lt. Col. Sol. S. Calhoun (of the consolidated 9th Regiment, April 1865).
- Lt. Col. Benjamin F. Johns (of the 7th Mississippi).

== Organization ==
Companies of the "Old" 9th Mississippi Infantry (April 1861 - April 1862):

- Company A, "Irrepressibles" of De Soto County.
- Company B, "Home Guards" of Marshall County.
- Company C, "Corinth Rifles" of Tishomingo County.
- Company D, "Jeff Davis Rifles" of Marshall County.
- Company E, "Horn Lake Volunteers" of De Soto County. Later became company A of the 10th Mississippi.
- Company F, "Quitman Rifle Guard" of Marshall County.
- Company G, "De Soto Guards" of De Soto County.
- Company H, "Lafayette Guards" of Lafayette County.
- Company I, "Senatobia Invincibles" of Panola County. Later became company B of the 42nd Mississippi.
- Company K, "Panola Guards".

Companies of the "New" 9th Mississippi Infantry (April 1862 - April 1865):

- Company A, of De Soto County.
- Company B
- Company C
- Company D
- Company E, "Vicksburg Cadets" of Warren County. Formerly company F of the 10th Mississippi.
- Company F, of Marshall County
- Company G
- Company H, "Semmes Rifles" of Madison County.
- Company I
- Company K

== See also ==
- List of Mississippi Civil War Confederate units
