= Patrick Irwin =

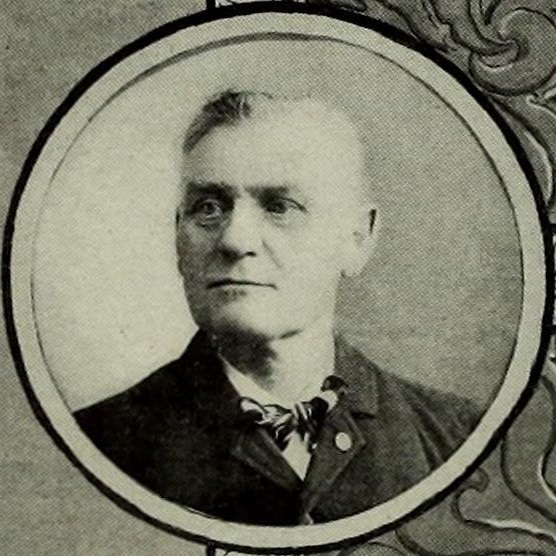
- Irwin c. 1901
- Born: 1839; County Clare, Ireland
- Died: February 6, 1910 (aged 70–71); Ann Arbor, Michigan, U.S.
- Burial place: St. Thomas Catholic Cemetery; Ann Arbor, Michigan, U.S.
- Military career
- Allegiance: United States
- Branch: United States Army
- Service years: 1861–1865
- Rank: Captain
- Unit: H Company, 14th Michigan Infantry Regiment
- Conflicts: American Civil War; Atlanta campaign; Battle of Jonesborough
- Awards: Medal of Honor

Patrick Irwin (1839 – February 6, 1910) was an American soldier who was awarded the Medal of Honor for his actions at the Battle of Jonesborough in 1864 during the American Civil War.

== Biography ==
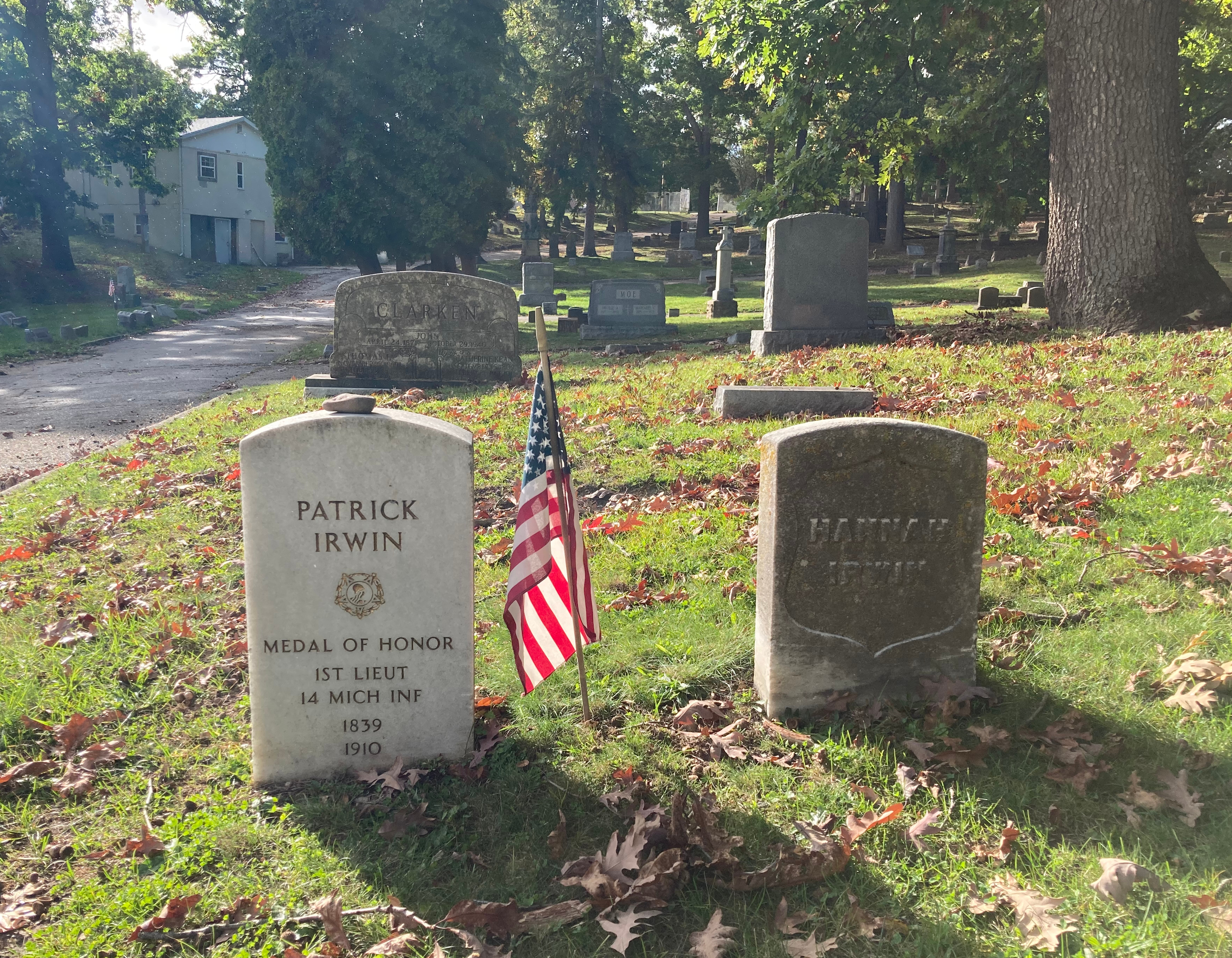
Irwin's grave, alongside that of his wife, at St. Thomas Cemetery

Irwin was born in County Clare, Ireland, and immigrated to the United States with his parents at the age of nine, settling in Ann Arbor, Michigan, where he later worked as a blacksmith. He joined the 14th Michigan Infantry Regiment as a sergeant on September 30, 1861, eventually rising to become first sergeant of Company H.

During the Battle of Jonesborough in Georgia on September 1, 1864, Irwin was cited as the first man from his regiment to hurdle over the earthworks of the entrenched opposing Confederates, and personally captured Brigadier General Daniel Govan, a brigade commander of the Army of Tennessee. Irwin was commissioned as a second lieutenant in October 1864 and was mustered out of the army on July 8, 1865, three days after his promotion to captain.

After the war, Irwin operated a livery yard and hotel in Bay City, Michigan, before resettling in Ann Arbor, where he lived quietly with his wife Hannah and two daughters. He died of a stroke in Ann Arbor on February 6, 1910, and was buried in the city's St. Thomas Catholic Cemetery. A new gravestone was erected in 1997 by the Ann Arbor Civil War Round Table.

== Medal of Honor ==
=== Nomination ===
In the late 1880s, the Department of War began examining unrewarded cases of heroism from the Civil War that might merit the Medal of Honor. For his feat at Jonesborough, Irwin was nominated by Captain Thomas Higgins of Company H, Colonel Henry R. Mizner of the 14th Michigan, and Major General James D. Morgan, commander of the Second Division, XIV Corps. A year later, however, Mizner claimed that Lieutenant Alex Witherspoon of the 14th was the first over the earthworks and also deserved a Medal of Honor, citing Witherspoon's possession of General Govan's spurs. What followed was a series of conflicting attestations by multiple officers of the Second Division about which regiment had first broken the Confederate line and who had captured Govan. After weighing the difficult evidence, the Department of War awarded the Medal of Honor to Irwin on April 28, 1896.

=== Citation ===
Service: United States Army
Rank: First Sergeant
Division: 14th Michigan Infantry
Action Date: September 1, 1864
Date of Issue: April 28, 1896

The President of the United States of America, in the name of Congress, takes pleasure in presenting the Medal of Honor to First Sergeant Patrick Irwin, United States Army, for extraordinary heroism on 1 September 1864, while serving with Company H, 14th Michigan Infantry, in action at Jonesboro, Georgia. In a charge by the 14th Michigan Infantry against the entrenched enemy, First Sergeant Irwin was the first man over the line of works of the enemy, and demanded and received the surrender of Confederate General Daniel Govan and his command.
