= Liljenquist collection =

American Civil War photographs

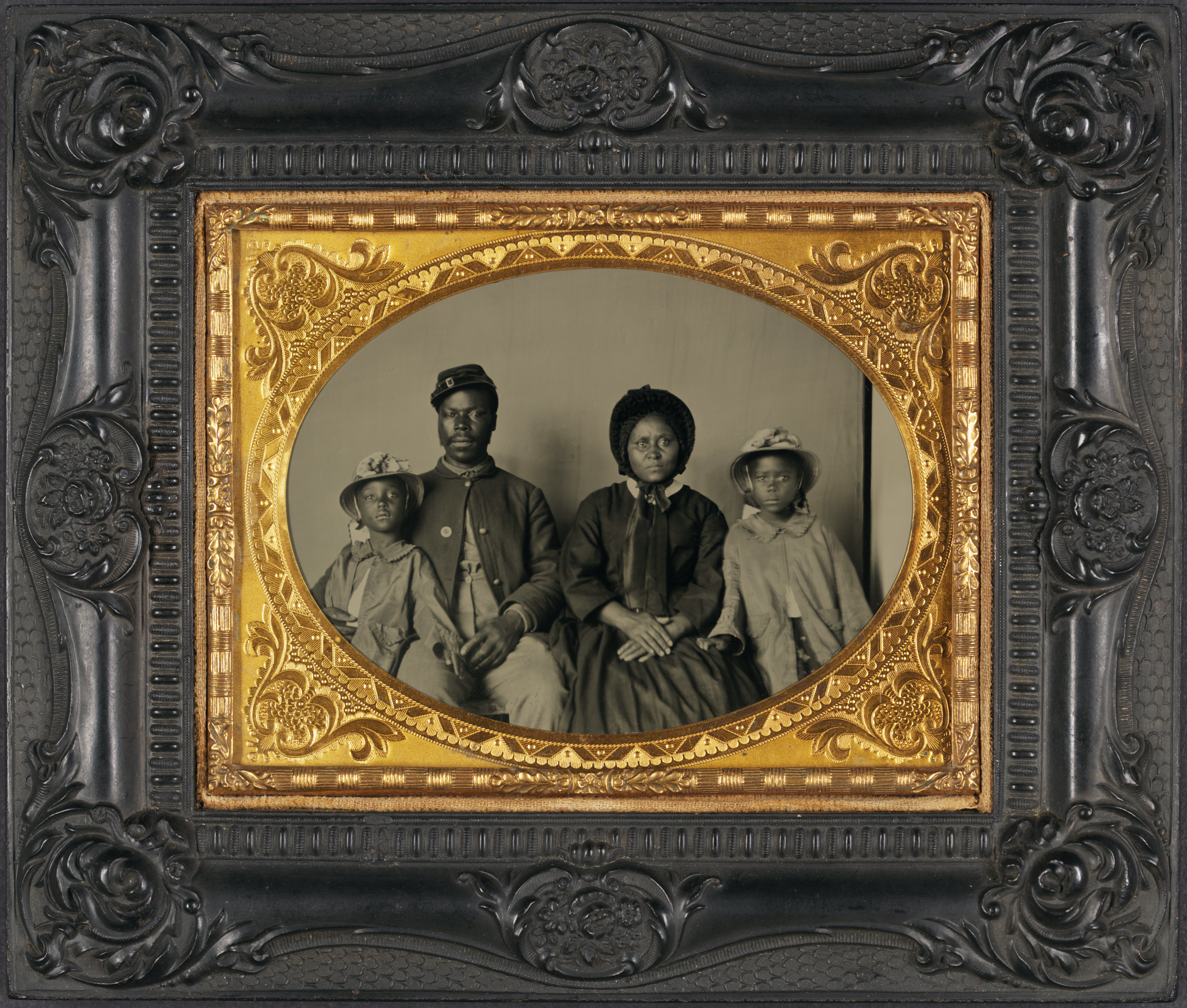
This now-iconic image of the family of Sgt. Samuel Smith, an African-American soldier wearing an Abraham Lincoln campaign pin, is a featured photo on Wikimedia Commons and was donated to the Library of Congress as part of the Liljenquist Collection

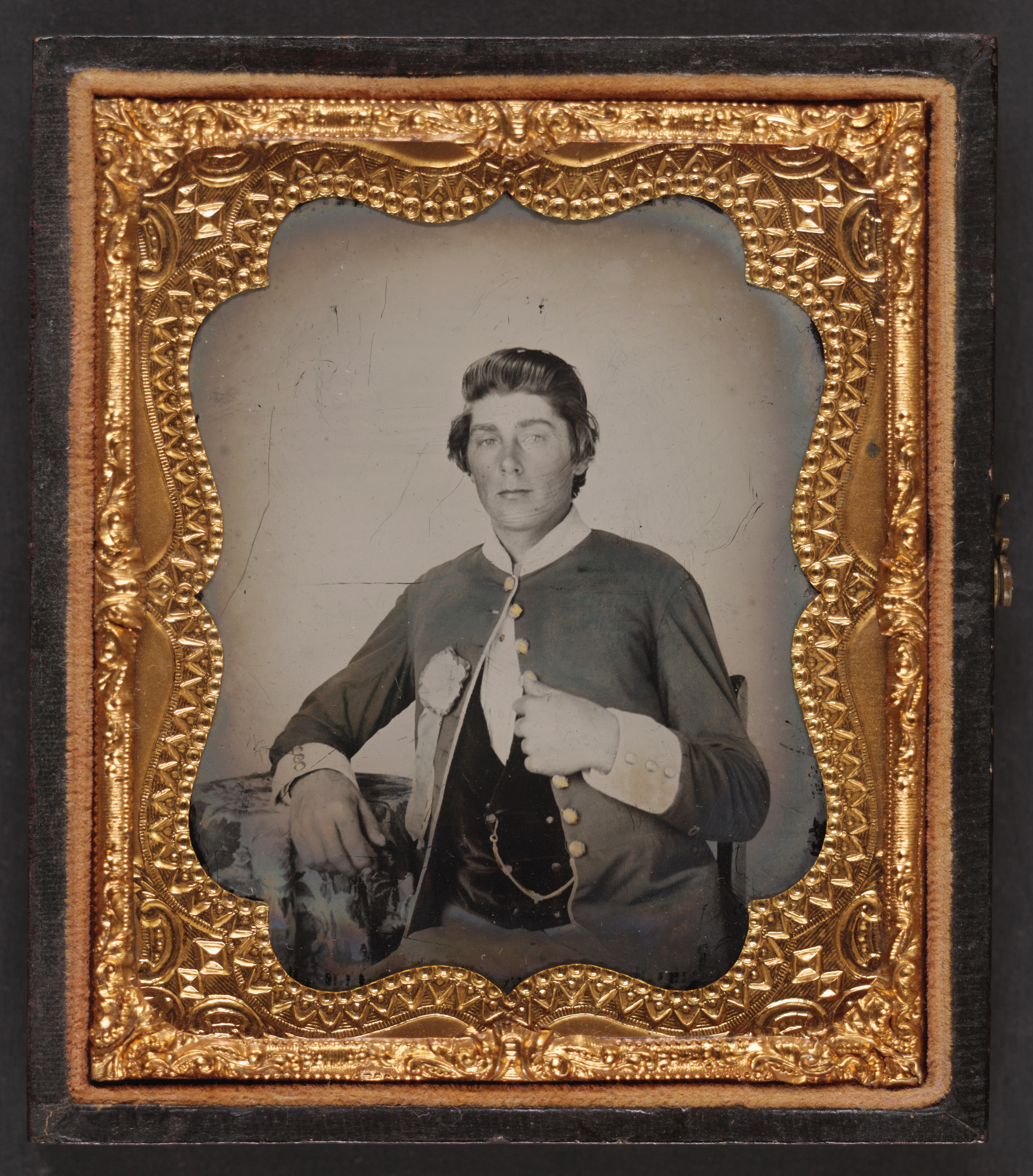
Unidentified soldier in Virginia Volunteer uniform and secession badge

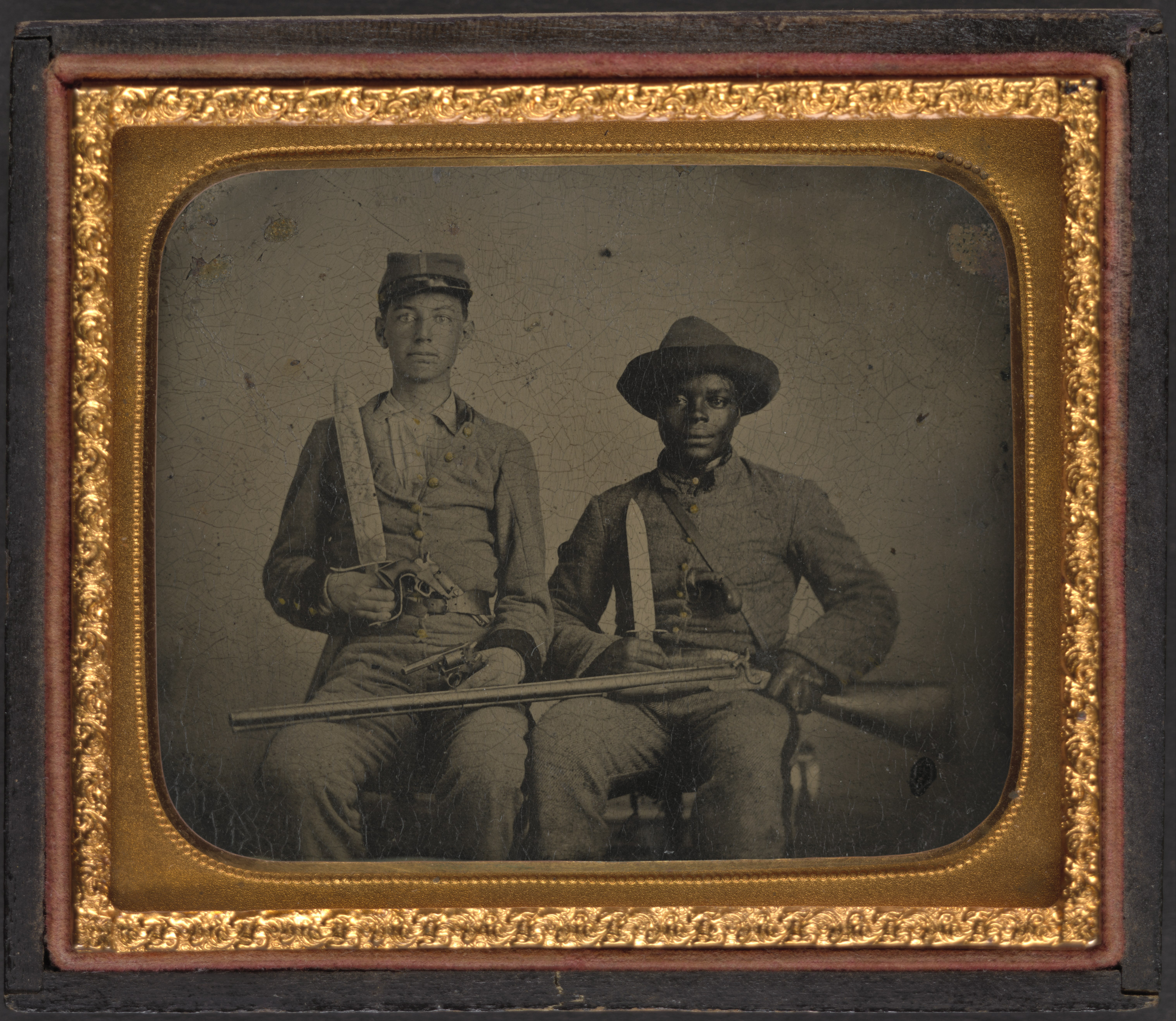
This image of A. M. Chandler and Silas Chandler was purchased from Chandler descendants and owned by the Liljenquists "for about 10 minutes" before it was donated to the Library of Congress

Liljenquist Family Collection of Civil War Photographs at the Library of Congress in Washington, D.C. is a collection of photographs and ephemera related to the American Civil War. The bulk of the collection comprises ambrotypes, tintypes, and cartes de visite of individual soldiers and officers from both sides of the conflict.

== History ==
The collection, still in progress, was assembled and donated by Tom Liljenquist, a business owner from McLean, Virginia, and his three sons, Jason Liljenquist, Brandon Liljenquist, and Christian Liljenquist. Liljenquist owns four jewelry and watch boutiques in the Delmarva area of the United States. The family assembled the first 700 items in the archive through online auctions and visiting Civil War memorabilia vendors. Research into a drummer boy from Maine, who served three years with what he wrote home was "the greatest army that was ever known" and died at age 21 from malaria complications, inspired the Liljenquists to donate their assembled collection to the Library. Ambrotypes, an early photographic process with a unique "tonality," were an early focus of the family'scollection. The collection now numbers over 7,000 items and the family continues to make donations of new items.

The Liljenquist Collection was the basis of the 2011 Library of Congress exhibit The Last Full Measure: Civil War Photographs from the Liljenquist Family Collection, which was organized to commemorate the 150th anniversary of the beginning of the American Civil War. Many of the photographs have been dispersed over time from their families of origin and lack identifications, so the Library of Congress created a Flickr stream and has a contact email for the collection, as it is actively soliciting potential IDs from genealogists and volunteer Civil War researchers. Community identifications have been made, either tentatively, or conclusively, such as a "famous" photo of a Confederate, initially cataloged as unidentified but familiar to hard-core Georgia historians, and a group photograph that was connected with Company H of the 124th New York Volunteer Infantry—an image including both a future Congressman and a Medal of Honor winner.

== See also ==
- Brady-Handy Collection
