= Battle of Jonesborough order of battle =

The order of battle for the Battle of Jonesborough includes:

- Battle of Jonesborough order of battle: Confederate
- Battle of Jonesborough order of battle: Union
