= 41st Mississippi Infantry Regiment =

American Civil War military unit

- Active: 1862 - 1865
- Disbanded: April 26, 1865
- Country: Confederate States
- Allegiance: Mississippi
- Branch: Army
- Type: Infantry
- Size: Regiment
- Engagements: American Civil War: Battle of Perryville; Battle of Chickamauga; Atlanta Campaign; Battle of Franklin; Carolinas Campaign

Commanders
- Notable commanders: William F. Tucker

The 41st Mississippi Infantry Regiment was a Confederate infantry regiment from Mississippi which fought in the Western theater of the American Civil War.

== History ==
The 41st Mississippi Infantry was organized at Pontotoc in the spring of 1862 by William F. Tucker, a veteran of the 11th Mississippi Infantry who had fought in Virginia during the early years of the war. Assigned to the brigade of General Patton Anderson, the 41st was sent to Kentucky and fought at the Battle of Perryville in October, where the regiment lost 18 killed and 72 wounded in battle. After retreating to Tennessee, the regiment was assigned to General James Ronald Chalmers' brigade during the Battle of Stones River at the close of 1862. In this battle the regiment lost 25 killed, 123 wounded, and 8 missing.

In February 1863 Colonel Tucker was tasked with leading Chalmers' brigade, and the regiment moved into Tennessee during the Tullahoma campaign. In September, the regiment fought at the Battle of Chickamauga in Georgia. As part of General Thomas C. Hindman's division, the regiment went into battle with 502 men on September 20, and suffered losses of 24 killed, 164 wounded, and 9 missing. In the subsequent Chattanooga campaign, the 41st fought at the Battle of Missionary Ridge in Tennessee in November before retreating to Georgia for the winter.

In early 1864 Colonel Tucker was promoted to brigadier general, and J. Byrd Williams was given command of the 41st Mississippi. During the summer 1864 Atlanta Campaign, the regiment fought in numerous battles around the city, and Colonel Williams was killed at the Battle of Jonesborough on August 31. During the Franklin–Nashville campaign the regiment took major losses, then retreated into Mississippi at the end of the year.

In the spring of 1865 the 41st was sent to join the Carolinas Campaign, and on April 9 it was consolidated with the remnants of the 7th, 9th, 10th, and 44th Mississippi Regiments along with the 9th Mississippi Sharpshooters Battalion. The remaining Confederate forces in North Carolina surrendered on April 26, 1865.

== Commanders ==
Commanders of the 41st Regiment:

- Colonel William F. Tucker, promoted to brigadier general, 1864.
- Colonel J. Byrd Williams, killed at Jonesborough, Georgia, 1864.
- Colonel Lewis Ball
- Lieutenant Colonel Lafayette Hodges, died 1864.

== Organization ==
Companies of the 41st Regiment:

- Company A, of Pontotoc County.
- Company B, "Southern Revengers", of Pontotoc County.
- Company C, "Cole Guards"
- Company D, "Noxubee Guards" of Noxubee County
- Company E, "Verona Rifles"
- Company F, "Pontotoc Greys" of Pontotoc County.
- Company G, "Buttahatchie Rifles" of Monroe County.
- Company H
- Company I
- Company K, "Mississippi Rip Raps"
- Company L, "Okolona Guards"

== See also ==
- List of Confederate units from Mississippi in the American Civil War
