= 7th Mississippi Infantry Regiment =

US Civil War Confederate military unit

- Active: April 1861 - April 1865
- Country: Confederate States
- Allegiance: Mississippi
- Branch: Army
- Type: Infantry
- Size: Regiment
- Battles: American Civil War: Battle of Shiloh; Battle of Munfordville; Battle of Stones River; Chickamauga Campaign; Chattanooga campaign; Atlanta campaign; Franklin-Nashville Campaign

The 7th Mississippi Infantry Regiment was a Confederate infantry regiment from Mississippi which fought in many battles of the Western theater of the American Civil War.

== History ==
The 7th Regiment was first organized for state service in April, 1861 and was sent to the Mississippi Gulf Coast by Governor John J. Pettus for coastal defense. On September 25, 1861 the Regiment was reassigned to Confederate service with an original strength of 911 officers and men. In February 1862, the Regiment was sent north to Tennessee, along the way the Regiment's troop train collided with another train outside of Ponchatoula, Louisiana. 28 men of the Regiment were killed in the accident, with many others wounded. In Tennessee, the 7th took part in the Battle of Shiloh under the command of Lt. Col. Hamilton Mayson. Afterwards the 7th returned to North Mississippi and took part in the Siege of Corinth. During the 1862 Kentucky Campaign, the Regiment fought at Munfordville, and later at the Battle of Stones River in Tennessee.

In the fall of 1863, the 7th Regiment fought in the Chickamauga campaign and the Chattanooga campaign, taking heavy casualties. The Regiment then participated in the Atlanta campaign, fighting at Rocky Face Ridge, New Hope Church, Kennesaw Mountain, and Jonesborough.

As part of Sharp's Brigade, the 7th Regiment fought in Hood's Tennessee campaign, with Col. William H. Bishop of the 7th killed during the Battle of Franklin. After the Confederate defeat at the Battle of Nashville, the Regiment retreated back to Mississippi and the men were furloughed until February 1865. The remnants of the 7th were then reorganized and ordered to North Carolina in April. The 7th, 9th, 10th, 41st, & 44th Mississippi Regiments along with the 9th Mississippi Battalion were then consolidated as the 9th Mississippi Regiment, and this combined unit under the command of Col. William C. Richards surrendered on April 26, 1865.

== Commanders ==
Commanders of the 7th Regiment:

- Col. Enos J. Goode
- Col. James Hamilton Mayson, resigned 1862.
- Col. William H. Bishop, killed at Franklin, 1864.
- Lt. Col. R.S. Carter
- Lt. Col. A.G. Mills
- Lt. Col. Benjamin F. Johns

== Organization ==
Companies of the 7th Regiment:

- Company A, "Franklin Rifles" of Franklin County.
- Company B, "Bogue Chitto Guards" of Pike County.
- Company C, "Amite Rifles" of Amite County.
- Company D, "Jeff Davis Sharpshooters" of Marion County.
- Company E, "Franklin Beauregards" of Franklin County.
- Company F, "Marion's Men" of Marion County.
- Company G, "Goode Rifles" of Lawrence County.
- Company H, "Dahlgren Rifles" of Pike County.
- Company I, "Covington Rifles" of Covington County.
- Company K, "Quitman Rifles" of Franklin County.

== See also ==
- List of Mississippi Civil War Confederate units
