= 24th Mississippi Infantry Regiment =

- Active: 1861-1865
- Country: Confederate States of America
- Allegiance: Mississippi
- Branch: Confederate States Army
- Type: Infantry
- Size: Regiment
- Battles: American Civil War: Siege of Corinth; Battle of Stones River; Battle of Chickamauga; Atlanta Campaign; Franklin-Nashville Campaign; Carolinas Campaign

The 24th Mississippi Infantry Regiment was an infantry unit of the Confederate States Army. The Regiment fought in numerous battles of the Western theater before surrendering in April, 1865.

== History ==
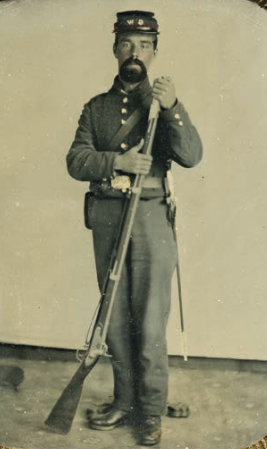
Sergeant of the 24th Mississippi, Company A

The 24th Mississippi was assembled from volunteer forces in the fall of 1861, and then sent to Georgia and North Florida under the command of General Robert E. Lee, who was responsible for organizing the defense of the sea coast. These efforts were abandoned in early 1862 and the Regiment was sent back to North Mississippi, joining the unsuccessful Confederate defense of a strategic railroad junction during the Siege of Corinth. Assigned to General James Patton Anderson's division, the 24th then joined the Confederate Heartland Offensive in Kentucky. Following the Confederate defeat at the Battle of Perryville in October, the 24th Regiment was moved back to Tennessee and reassigned to General Edward C. Walthall's Mississippi Brigade.

Over the winter of 1862–1863, the 24th Mississippi fought at the Battle of Stones River in Tennessee, suffering 8 killed and 108 wounded. The defeated Confederates then withdrew to Georgia, and the Regiment was engaged at the Battle of Chickamauga in September 1863, losing 10 killed and 103 wounded. During the Chattanooga Campaign, the Regiment returned to Tennessee, fighting at the Battle of Lookout Mountain in November and taking 189 casualties.

The Regiment fought at Ezra Church and Resaca during the Atlanta Campaign under a joint command with the 27th Mississippi, the combined force taking 130 casualties during these battles. The Regiment then joined General John Bell Hood's march into Tennessee during the Franklin-Nashville Campaign, suffering further losses during these Confederate defeats. On April 9, 1865, the 24th was consolidated into a single regiment along with the remnants of the 27th, 29th, and 34th Mississippi regiments. The combined unit was sent to join the Carolinas Campaign and then surrendered at Greensboro, North Carolina on April 26, 1865. Only 25 men were left in the regiment at the time of the Confederate surrender.

== Commanders ==
Commanders of the 24th Mississippi Infantry:

- Col. William F. Dowd, resigned 1864 due to disability.
- Col. Robert P. McKelvaine, wounded at Atlanta.
- Lt. Col. William L. Lyles

== Organization ==
Companies of the 24th Mississippi Infantry:

- Company A, "Gaines Warriors" of Greene County.
- Company B, "Mississippi Confederates" of Monroe County.
- Company C, "Dowd Rebels" of Chickasaw County.
- Company D, "Caledonia Rifles" of Lowndes County.
- Company E, "Helen Johnson Guards" of Madison County.
- Company F, "Cummings Grays" of Itawamba.
- Company G, "Briarfield Defenders" of Warren County.
- Company H, "Buena Vista Hornets" of Chickasaw County.
- Company I, "Kemper Rebels" of Kemper County.
- Company K, "Choctaw Rebels" of Choctaw County.
- Company L, "Monroe Rangers/Athens Guard"

== See also ==
- List of Mississippi Civil War Confederate units
