= James L. Autry =

American politician (1830–1862)

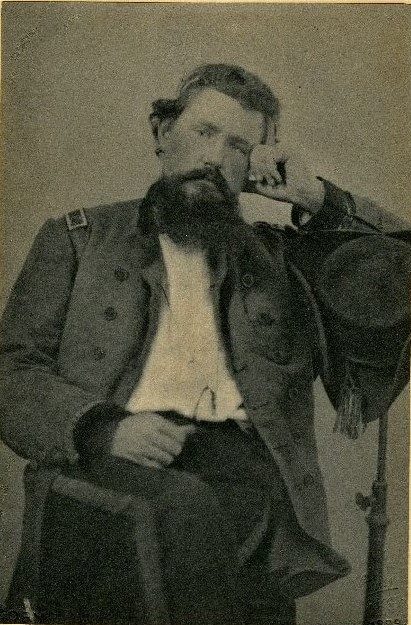

Speaker of the Mississippi House of Representatives
- In office 1858–1859

Member of the Mississippi House of Representatives from Marshall County
- In office 1854–1859

Personal details
- Born: James Lockhart Autry; January 8, 1830 Davidson County, Tennessee, U.S.
- Died: December 31, 1862 (aged 32) near Murfreesboro, Tennessee, U.S.

Military service
- Branch/service: Confederate States Army
- Years of service: 1861–1862
- Rank: Lieutenant colonel
- Unit: 27th Mississippi Infantry Regiment
- Battles/wars: American Civil War; Battle of Stones River †

James Lockhart Autry (January 8, 1830 – December 31, 1862) was an American politician who served as the Speaker of the Mississippi House of Representatives between 1858 and 1859. Autry later served in the Confederate Army, where he was killed during the United States Civil War.

== Early life ==
James Lockhart Autry was born on January 8, 1830, in Davidson County, Tennessee. Autry's father died at the Battle of the Alamo in 1836. Autry attended school in Holly Springs, Mississippi, with James Ronald Chalmers among his schoolmates.

== Political career ==
Autry became a lawyer in 1852. Autry served in the Mississippi House of Representatives between 1854 and 1859. Between 1858 and 1859, Autry served as the Speaker of the Mississippi House of Representatives. On June 22, 1859, Autry gave a speech to the literary societies of Semple Broaddus College, a Baptist college that was once located in DeSoto County, Mississippi.

== Military service and death ==
Autry joined the Confederate States Army and initially served in the Home Guards of Marshall County as a third lieutenant. Autry was promoted to a lieutenant colonel shortly after in the 9th Mississippi Regiment. Autry became a lieutenant colonel of the 27th Mississippi Infantry Regiment in the spring of the 1862 in a reorganization. In early 1862, Autry was sent to serve as Military Governor and Post Commandant of Vicksburg, Mississippi, which was threatened by Federal advances up the Mississippi river. When Union gunboats captured Natchez and called upon Vicksburg to surrender, Autry replied, "Mississippians don't know and refuse to learn how to surrender to an enemy. If Commodore Farragut or Brigadier-General Butler can teach them, let them come and try." Autry's defiant reply was widely publicized, and the city of Vicksburg held out for another year until its final capture in July, 1863. Autry subsequently rejoined the 27th Regiment in the late summer of 1862. During the Battle of Stones River, also known as the Battle of Murfreesboro, on December 31, 1862, Autry was cheering his men forward, when he was struck in the head with a Minié ball. Autry died almost immediately. At the time of his death, Jefferson Davis had just signed a letter promoting Autry to general. The letter was on the way to Autry.

== Personal life ==
Autry married Jeannie C. Valliant in 1858, and had a single child, James Lockhart Autry II, in 1859.
