= Rosa Lee Tucker =

American librarian

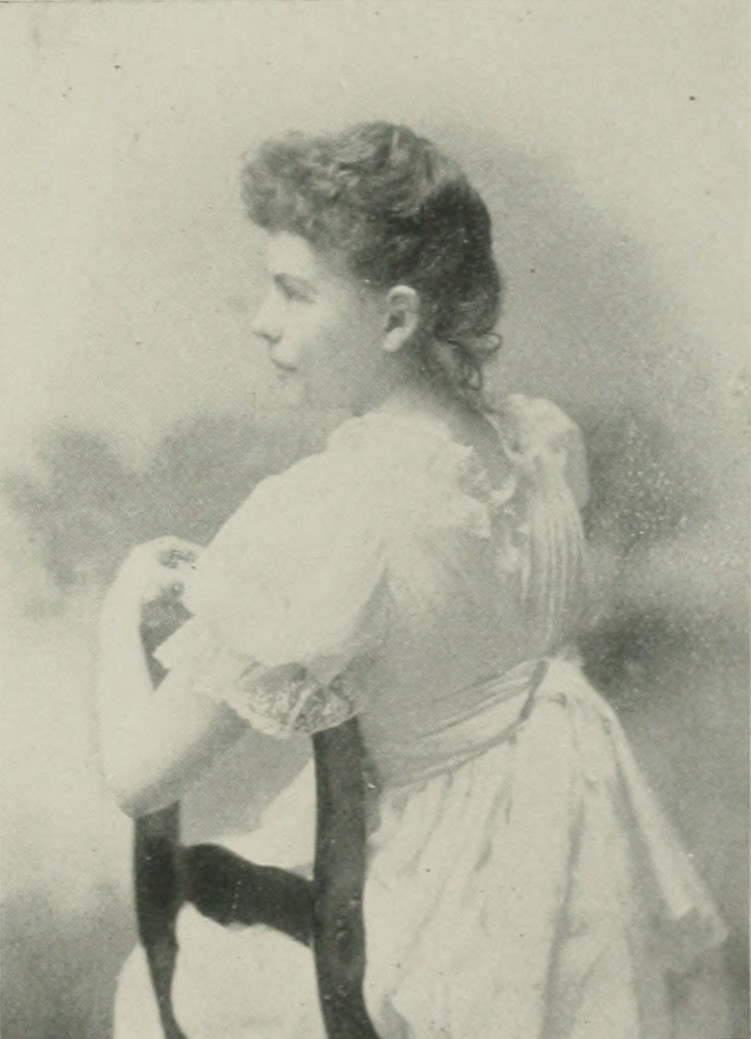
Rosa Lee Tucker, "A woman of the century"

Rosa Lee Tucker Battle (née Tucker; September 1, 1866 – September 23, 1946) was an American librarian. While still a teenager, she served as State Librarian of Mississippi.

== Early years and education ==
Rosalie Tucker was born in Houston, Mississippi (or Okolona, Mississippi), September 1, 1866. She was a daughter of Martha Josephine Shackelford Tucker, of Welsh descent, and General William F. Tucker, whose family came from Bermuda. Her grandparents were Thomas Larkin and Sarah Hall (Feimster) Tucker. General Tucker served in the Confederate States Army during the Civil War. After the war, like most of the southern men, impoverished by the long struggle, he resumed the practice of his profession, that of law, and became one of the most successful lawyers in Mississippi. Like the majority of the men of the South, he lived beyond his means. Consequently, when he died, in 1881, his family was left in strained circumstances. Rosa Lee, who was then thirteen years old, remained in school until she was sixteen. She had three sisters and two brothers.

== Career ==
After her graduation she taught school for one year. On June 17, 1886, she married Charles Smith Battle. In the same year, she became the manager of the post office in Okolona, Mississippi, where her mother was postmaster. She managed the office acceptably for two years. In 1888, she was elected State Librarian of Mississippi, a position she held for two terms. As she was less than twenty years old when elected to that responsible position, she might have been the youngest woman ever chosen to fill an office of so high a grade.

In 1901, the family settled in Vancouver, British Columbia, Canada, where Charles started a timber business. He was active in politics in the U.S. but not in Canada. During World War I, she worked with the Red Cross. She was a member of the United Daughters of the Confederacy and the Daughters of the American Revolution. She died in the Vancouver General Hospital, September 23, 1946, and was survived by one daughter and two sons.
