= Amos McLemore =

American minister and Confederate soldier

- Born: August 23, 1823; Mississippi, US
- Died: October 5, 1863 (aged 40); Amos Deason Home, Ellisville, Mississippi, US
- Military career
- Branch: Confederate States Army
- Service years: 1861–1863
- Unit: 27th Mississippi Infantry Regiment
- Conflicts: American Civil War

Amos McLemore (August 23, 1823 – October 5, 1863) of Jones County, Mississippi, was a schoolteacher, Methodist Episcopal minister, merchant and Confederate States Army soldier. He was killed at Deason Home.

== Introduction and ancestry ==
McLemore was born on August 23, 1823, probably in Simpson or Copiah County, Mississippi. He was the oldest son of John and Anna Maria McLemore. The McLemore family had been established in the South for nearly two hundred years. The patriarchs and matriarchs of the American McLemore family were James and Abraham McLemore, who probably were brothers, and Fortune (Gilliam) McLemore, James's wife. James arrived in America, probably from Scotland, not later than March 1, 1691. The name McLemore derives from the Gaelic patronymic Macghillemhuire (the spelling of which has varied from writer to writer and from time to time in Scotland, Ireland, the Isle of Man and North America). The name means "son of a servant or devotee of the Virgin Mary" and originated among the Celto-Norse people (Norse-Gaels) who populated the lands bordering the Irish and Hebridean seas.

== Life ==
McLemore opposed Southern secession from the Union though his business partner, Dr. J.M. Bayliss, supported it. Nevertheless, once invasion from the North seemed inevitable McLemore volunteered to raise a company for the Confederate States Army. It was mustered into Confederate service in Ellisville as Company B, 27th Mississippi Infantry Regiment, on September 10, 1861, with McLemore as its Captain. Company B, known as the Rosin Heels, was "the second [company] among eight raised in the area that consisted of all, or significant numbers of Jones County men." On March 16, 1863, McLemore was promoted to major and placed third in command of the Regiment. In spite of pre-War opposition to secession and the number of "transient deserters", the activities of such formerly anti-secessionist individuals as McLemore, according to historian (and descendant of McLemore) Rudy H. Leverett, along with the facts "that virtually every able-bodied man in the county was on active duty in organizations such as those commanded by McLemore … and that the Union raiding party entering the county in June 1863 was captured by civilians, and the Union prisoners had to be protected from the local citizens" present evidence that the citizens of Jones County were loyal to the Confederacy.

== Death ==
One of these deserters and his followers killed Major McLemore on October 5, 1863, while McLemore was dispatched temporarily from the Atlanta area back to Jones County to round up deserters who had returned there and to recruit any new individuals he could. McLemore, a guest of State Representative Amos Deason at his home on the outskirts of Ellisville, spent the afternoon and evening of that cold, rainy, October day in conversation with Deason and others in the parlor of the small 4-room house. The leader of a number of the resident deserters, Newton Knight, reputedly shot McLemore in the back as he prepared for bed, killing him in order to prevent him from ordering the deaths of ex-Confederate deserters.
