= Brady-Handy collection =

Library of Congress photo set

The Brady-Handy collection is a historical photo archive of the United States. The collection is a cache of "mostly Civil War and post-Civil War portraits, with a small collection of Washington views" purchased by the Library of Congress in 1954, from descendants of Levin C. Handy, nephew and apprentice of photographer Mathew Brady. The collection included 10,000 original, duplicate, and copy negatives including about 4,000 original wet collidion plates and 1,300 glass plate negatives. The collection also included 24 daguerreotypes.

The credited photographers are chiefly—but by no means entirely—Brady, Brady studio, and Handy. Other photographers represented included Timothy H. O'Sullivan, Alexander Gardner, Cruikshank, and various photographers of Confederate generals.

There is also a Brady studio register dated 1870 to 1876 that includes notes such as "refunded—Baby would not sit still" and "Capitol Policeman, to be charged half price."

There were some restrictions on use of the collection in place until 1964. According to the Library of Congress, all of the images in the Brady-Handy collection have now entered the public domain.

== See also ==
- Liljenquist collection
