= 1862 Ponchatoula train wreck =

Fatal train collision during the Civil War

Details
- Date: February 27, 1862; Around 7 a.m.
- Location: South of Ponchatoula, Louisiana
- Coordinates: 30°25′2″N 90°26′57″W
- Incident type: Head-on collision

Statistics
- Trains: 2
- Deaths: 28
- Injured: 10

The 1862 Ponchatoula train wreck was a train collision that occurred in Louisiana during the American Civil War.

== Background ==
In 1861, the 7th Mississippi Infantry Regiment was formed in Corinth, Mississippi to serve the Confederate forces. By 1862, they had received marching orders and were to travel north to Tennessee. This journey began in February of 1862 and the forces were given a train as means of transport.

== Accident ==
On February 27, 1862 the regiment train was heading northbound near Ponchatoula. At this time, a lumber train was also using this rail line and had failed to pull into a siding. Foggy conditions had also immensely reduced visibility.

Around 7 a.m., the two trains collided head-on, resulting in the car closest to the train to telescope, resulting in a high number of casualties. Most of the soldiers on the train were asleep at the time of the impact.

Twenty-two died on-site, with another six dying later as a result of their injuries; 10 others were seriously wounded. Immediately following the collision, the engineer of the lumber train fled the site and hid in the nearby forest. He was eventually captured and tried, but all charges would be dropped.

After receiving medical treatment, the regiment continued their journey, and fought in the Battle of Shiloh.
