= Patton Anderson =

Patton Anderson may refer to:

- Patton Anderson (speculator) (d. 1810), a Tennessee slave speculator and murder victim
- James Patton Anderson (1822–1872), an American military officer and politician, nephew of the former
