= William F. Tucker =

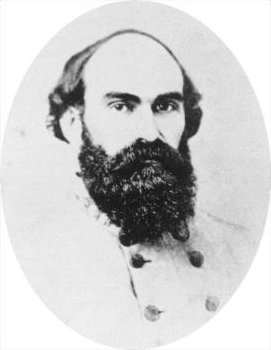

Member of the Mississippi House of Representatives from the Chickasaw County district
- In office 1876–1880

Personal details
- Born: May 9, 1827 Iredell County, North Carolina
- Died: September 14, 1881 (aged 54) Okolona, Mississippi
- Resting place: Odd Fellows Cemetery; Okolona, Mississippi
- Occupation: Lawyer; Judge; Politician

Military service
- Allegiance: Confederate States of America
- Branch/service: Confederate States Army Infantry
- Years of service: 1861 – 1865 (CSA)
- Rank: Brigadier General
- Battles/wars: American Civil War: Battle of First Bull Run; Battle of Perryville; Battle of Murfreesboro; Battle of Chickamauga; Battle of Chattanooga; Atlanta campaign; Battle of Resaca

William Feimster Tucker (May 9, 1827 – September 14, 1881) was a brigadier general in the Confederate States Army during the American Civil War.

== Early life ==
Tucker was born in Iredell County, North Carolina. He attended Emory and Henry College in Abingdon, Virginia, and graduated in 1848. That same year he moved to Houston, Mississippi. In 1855, he was elected probate judge of Chickasaw County. Tucker then studied law and was admitted to the bar and began practicing.

== Civil War ==
Tucker entered the Confederate Army as a captain of Company K, 11th Mississippi Infantry Regiment. He was part of Barnard Bee's brigade at the First Battle of Manassas. Soon afterwards Tucker's company was sent to the West and merged with the 41st Mississippi Infantry Regiment. Tucker was commissioned colonel of the regiment in May 1862. He led the regiment at the Battles of Perryville, Murfreesboro, Chickamauga, and Chattanooga before being promoted to brigadier general to rank from March 1, 1864. Tucker's field duty ended that summer after suffering a severe wound at the Battle of Resaca during the Atlanta campaign. In the last weeks of the war he commanded the District of Southern Mississippi and East Louisiana.

== Post-war and murder ==
After the war, Tucker returned to Chickasaw County and again practiced law. He was elected to the state house of representatives in 1876 and 1878, representing Chickasaw County. He was assassinated on September 14, 1881, in Okolona, Mississippi. It was alleged that a man whom Tucker had a case pending against had hired two men to assassinate him. His daughter, Rosa Lee Tucker, served as State Librarian of Mississippi. His son, also named William Feimster Tucker, served in the Mississippi legislature.

== See also ==
- List of American Civil War generals (Confederate)
