= 27th Mississippi Infantry Regiment =

Infantry regiment of the Confederate States Army

- Active: 1861–1865
- Country: Confederate States
- Allegiance: Mississippi
- Branch: Army
- Type: Infantry
- Size: Regiment
- Engagements: American Civil War: Battle of Pensacola (1861); Battle of Perryville; Battle of Stones River; Battle of Lookout Mountain; Battle of Chickamauga; Battle of Resaca; Battle of Franklin; Battle of Nashville

Commanders
- Notable commanders: James L. Autry

The 27th Mississippi Infantry Regiment was a regiment of infantry in the Confederate States Army during the American Civil War. The 27th Mississippi fought in many battles of the Western theater in Kentucky, Tennessee, and Georgia.

== Battles and campaigns ==
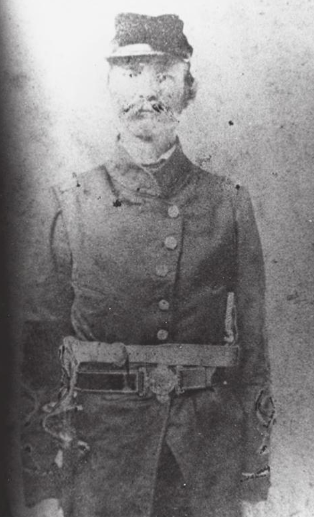
Lieutenant Samuel Wyles Johnson, Company L, 27th Mississippi Infantry.

The 27th Mississippi was organized in November - December 1861 from volunteer companies assembled at Pensacola, Florida under the overall command of General Braxton Bragg. When the Confederates abandoned Fort McRee after the Battle of Pensacola, Colonel Thomas H. Jones of the 27th Regiment was placed in charge of the evacuation of Confederate troops from the area in March 1862. The regiment was sent north that same month, and assigned to General William J. Hardee's corps.

In early 1862, Lieutenant Colonel James L. Autry of the 27th Regiment, a former Speaker of the Mississippi House of Representatives, was sent to serve as Military Governor and Post Commandant of Vicksburg, Mississippi, which was threatened by Federal advances up the Mississippi River. When Union gunboats captured Natchez and called upon Vicksburg to surrender, Autry replied, "Mississippians don't know and refuse to learn how to surrender to an enemy. If Commodore Farragut or Brigadier-General Butler can teach them, let them come and try." Autry's defiant reply was widely publicized, and the city of Vicksburg held out for another year until its final capture in July, 1863. Autry subsequently rejoined the 27th in the late summer of 1862.

The 27th fought at the Battle of Perryville, Kentucky, in October 1862. Afterwards, the Regiment retreated with General Bragg's troops to Tennessee. Subsequently, the 27th was transferred to General James Patton Anderson's command just prior to the Battle of Stones River in December 1862 - January 1863, where the 27th came under heavy fire and regimental commander Lt. Col. Autry was killed. At the time of Autry's death, a letter from Confederate President Jefferson Davis was on its way to him promoting Autry to General, but he died before receiving it.

The Regiment fought in the Chickamauga campaign in the fall of 1863 as part of Walthall's brigade, and was heavily engaged at the Battle of Lookout Mountain in the Chattanooga campaign. In the Atlanta campaign, the 27th was combined with the 24th Mississippi Regiment and fought at the Battle of Ezra Church, the Battle of Jonesborough, and the Battle of Resaca, where Lt. Col. A.J. Jones, acting commander of the combined 27th and 24th was killed.

In the fall of 1863, on special orders from General Bragg, Major Amos McLemore of the 27th was sent to Jones County, Mississippi to pursue Confederate deserters in the vicinity. McLemore and most of the 27th's Company B were from Jones County, which was becoming a center of anti-Confederate resistance by 1863. On October 5, McLemore was shot and killed in the Amos Deason Home in Ellisville, most likely by Newton Knight or one of his followers. The assassination of McLemore was the first major action in a series of battles between Knight's Unionist guerillas and Confederate forces in Jones County and the surrounding areas which would continue until the end of the war.

As part of General William F. Brantley's brigade, the 27th Regiment took part in the Franklin–Nashville campaign in the fall of 1864, fighting at Spring Hill, Franklin, and Nashville. At this point Brantley's brigade had taken so many casualties that it was only at regimental strength.

After withdrawing to Tupelo, Mississippi for the winter, in the spring of 1865, the 27th was ordered to the Carolinas, where it was reorganized along with the 24th, 29th, and 34th Mississippi Infantry Regiments into a single consolidated 24th Mississippi Regiment under Col. R.W. Williamson, on April 9. This combined unit was part of General Joseph E. Johnston's Army of Tennessee which surrendered in April.

Casualties of the 27th Regiment include 83 at Murfreesboro, 117 at Chickamauga, and 208 at Chattanooga. In the Atlanta Campaign, the Regiment had 6 killed, 27 wounded at Resaca, and at Ezra Church 11 killed and 67 wounded.

== Commanders ==
- Colonel Thomas M. Jones, resigned 1863.
- Colonel James A. Campbell, died February 1864 at Johnson's Island POW camp.
- Lt. Col. James L. Autry, killed at Stones River.
- Lt. Col. A.J. Hays
- Lt. Col. Andrew J. Jones, killed at Resaca.
- Maj. George H. Lipscomb, killed at Perryville.
- Maj. Amos McLemore, killed by the Knight Company in Jones County, Mississippi.
- Maj. Julius B. Kennedy, killed at Atlanta.

== Organization ==
Companies of the 27th Mississippi Infantry Regiment:

- Company A, Oktibbeha Riflemen
- Company B, "Rosin Heels" of Jones County
- Company C, "Fredonia Hards" of Brookhaven
- Company D, "Rayburn Rifles" of Brookhaven
- Company E, "Leake Guards" of Leake County
- Company F, "Covington Fencibles" of Covington County
- Company G, "Kennedy Guards" of Augusta
- Company H, "Jasper Blues"
- Company I, "Harris Rebels"
- Company K, "Enfield Rifles" of Monroe County
- Company L, "Twiggs Rifles" of Pascagoula

== See also ==
- List of Mississippi Civil War Confederate units
