= Secession badge =

1860–1861 U.S. clothing accessory

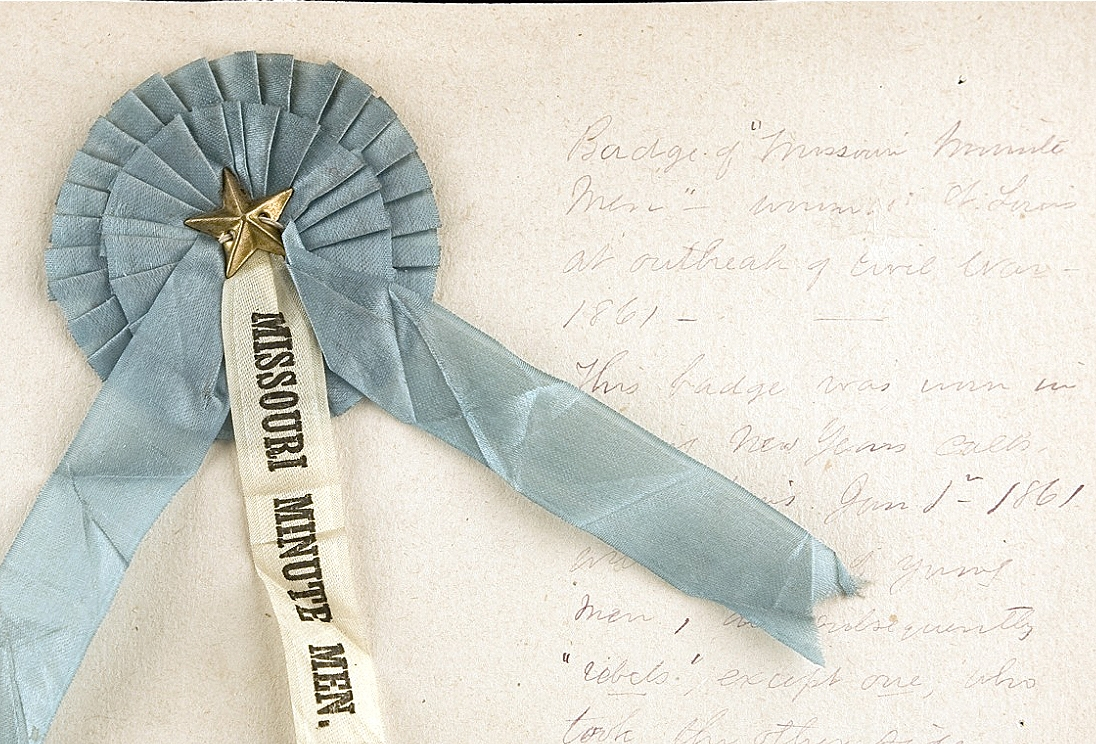
Cockade of the Missouri Minutemen, a secessionist paramilitary

A secession badge, also called a secession cockade, was a decorative flower made of fabric or ribbon that was used to signal support for the secession of slave states from the United States during the sectional crisis that began in 1858. The badge was often attached with a pin that bore symbolic significance, such as a palmetto for South Carolina. One memoirist recalled of the early days of the American Civil War, "...it was not uncommon to meet on Pennsylvania Avenue a defiant Southerner openly wearing a Virginia or South Carolina secession badge." In December 1860, the Washington Star reported from the barroom of Brown's Hotel that someone claimed the Southerners had fired on Fort Sumter, and "One solitary secession cockade made its appearance during the evening, wearing a lonesome aspect, and evidently pining for sympathy that was not forthcoming."

== Additional images ==
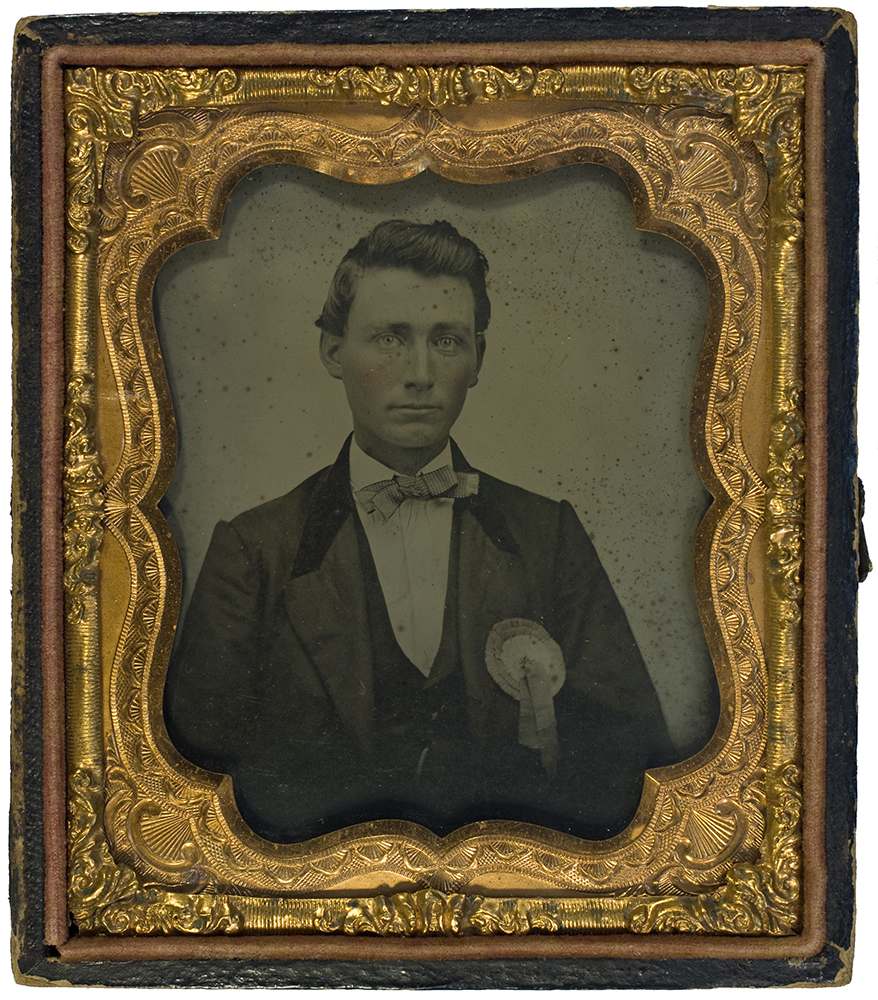
"Confederate with secession cockade" (Southern Methodist University libraries)

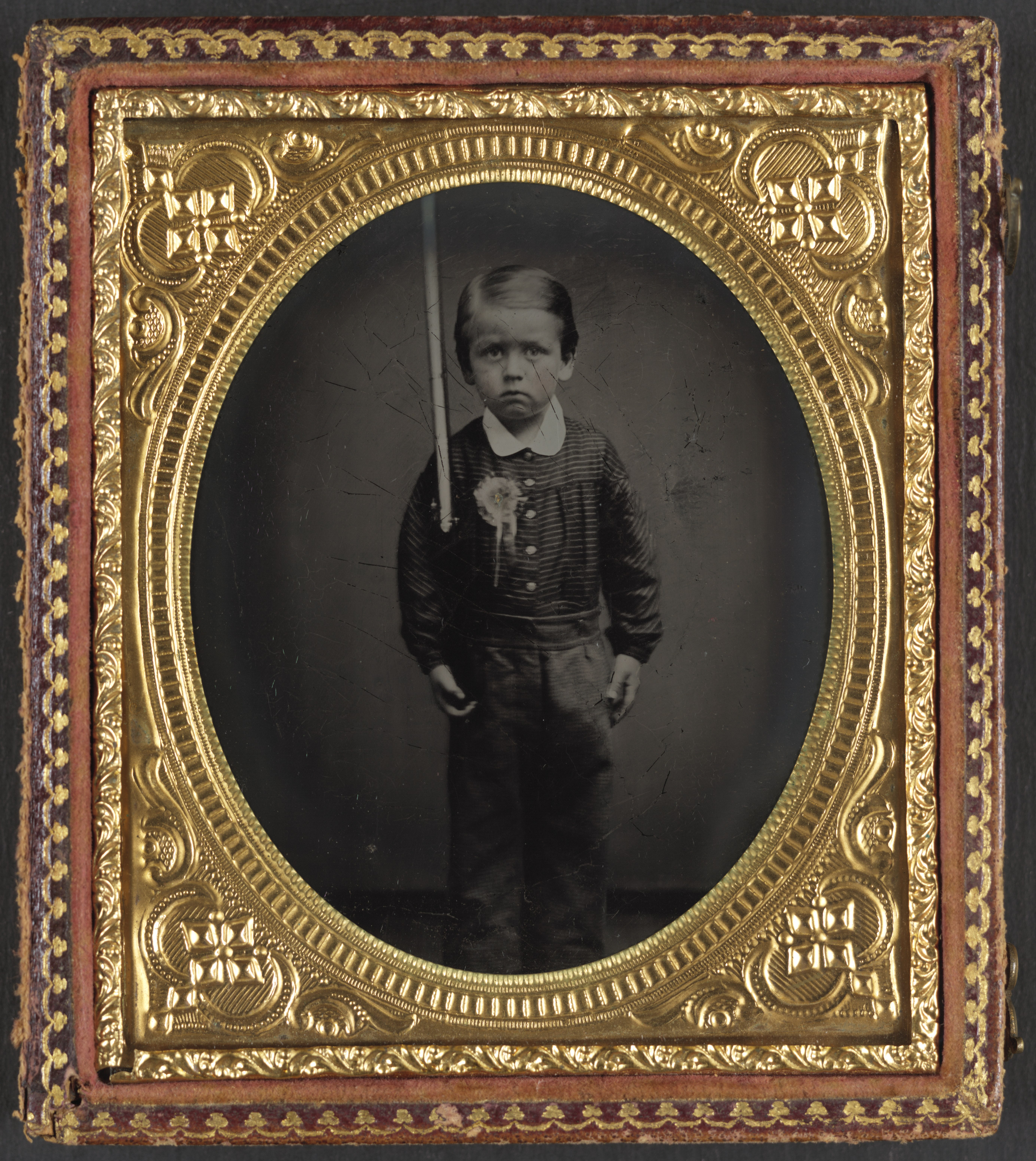
Unidentified young boy wearing secession badge and holding a rifle

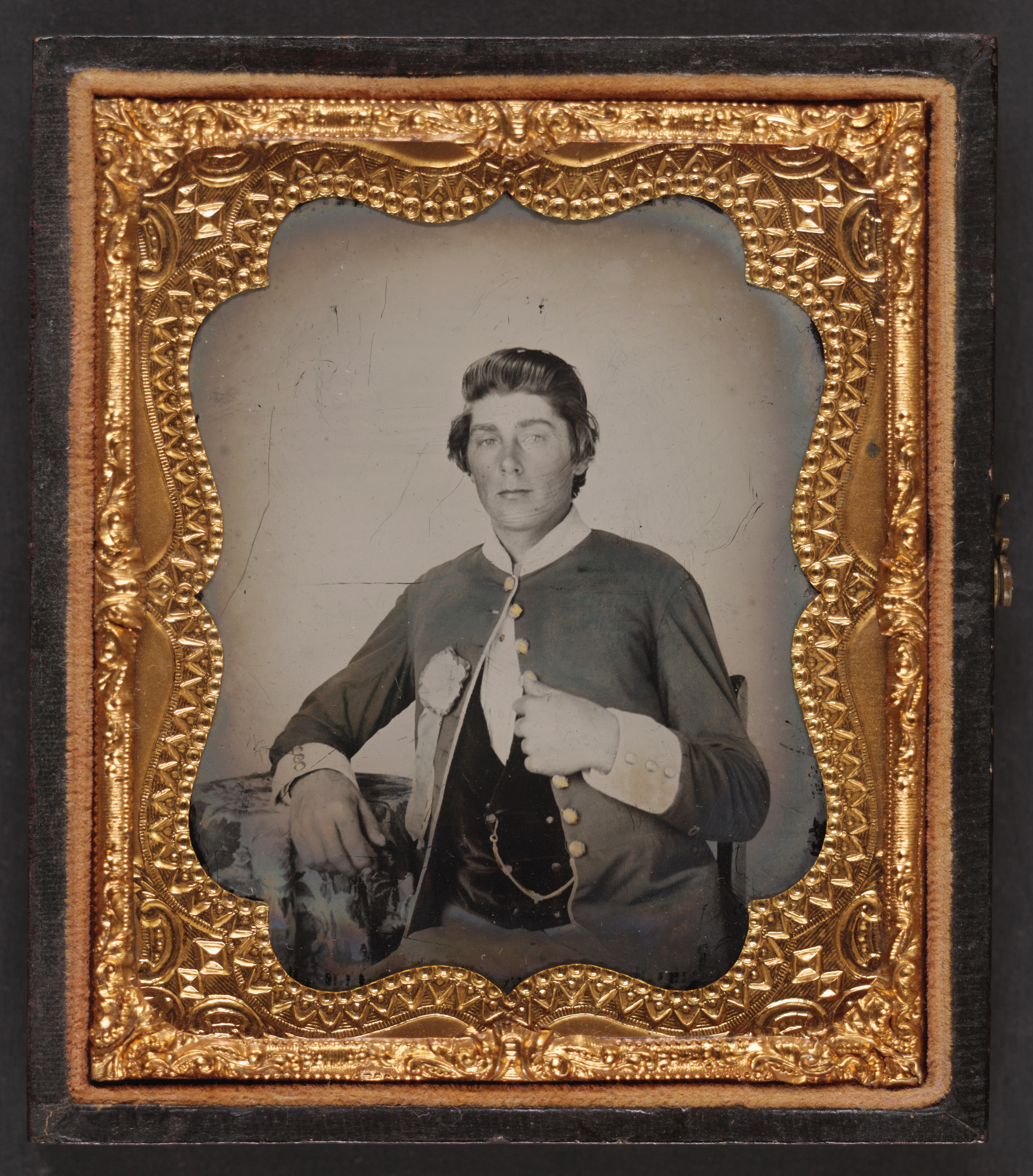
Virginian in volunteer uniform with secession badge (Liljenquist collection, LOC)

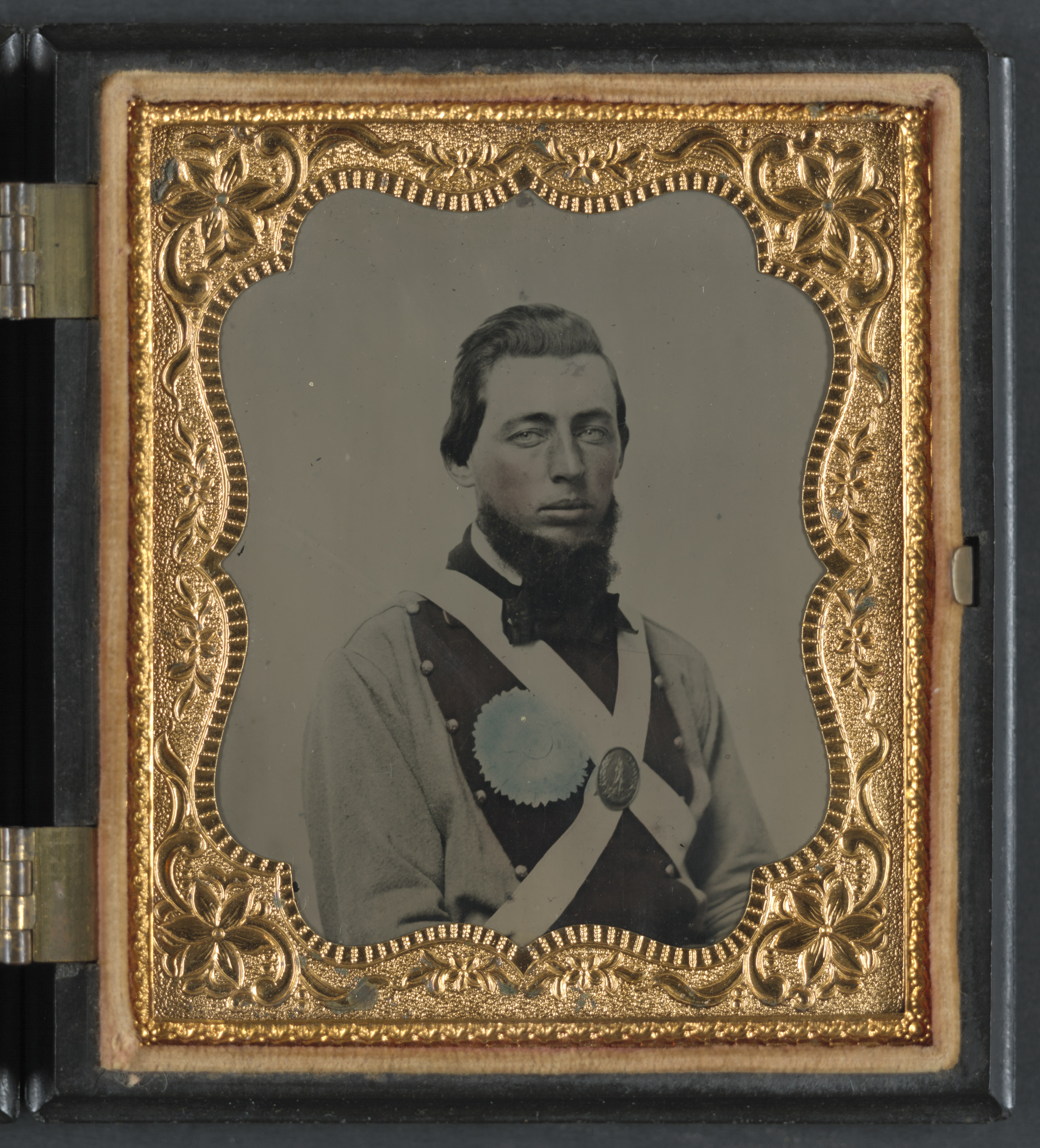
Private Peter S. Arthur of Company B, 11th Virginia Infantry Regiment

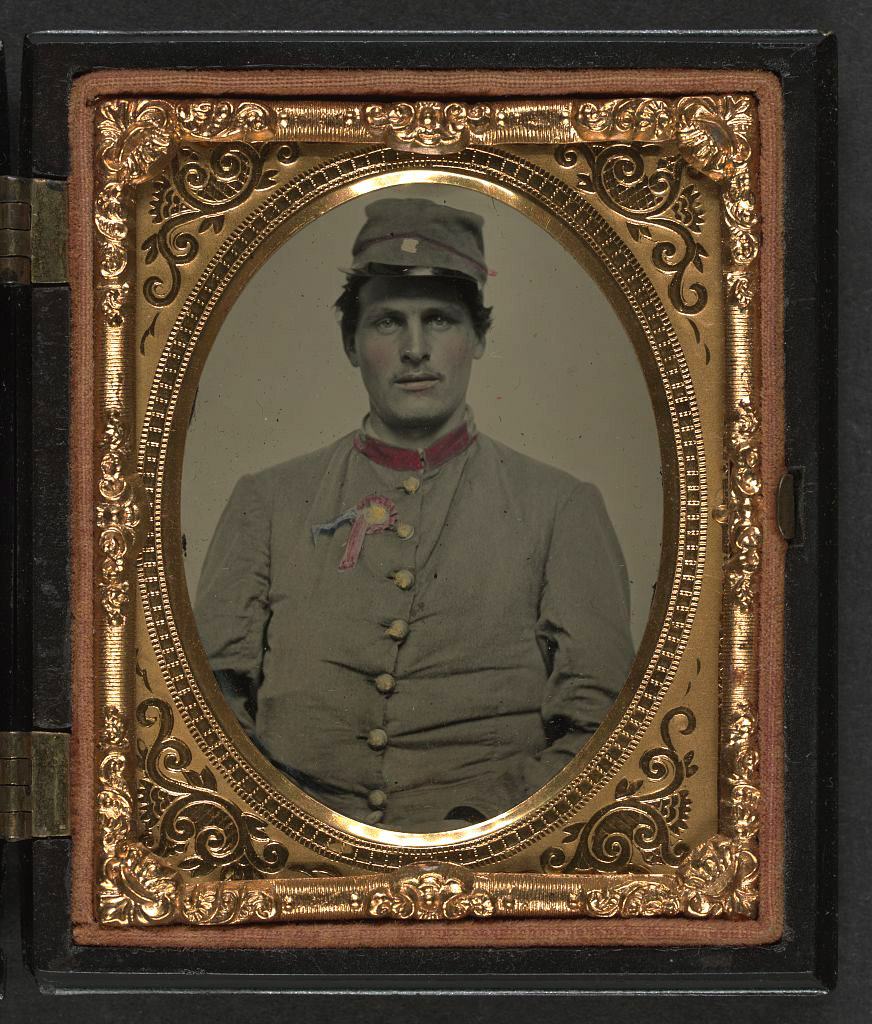
Unidentified artilleryman wearing secession badge
