= Battle of Jonesborough order of battle: Union =

Units in the 1864 battle

The following Union Army units and commanders fought in the Battle of Jonesborough of the American Civil War on August 31-September 1, 1864. The Confederate order of battle is listed separately.

== Abbreviations used ==
=== Military rank ===
- MG = Major General
- BG = Brigadier General
- Col = Colonel
- Ltc = Lieutenant Colonel
- Maj = Major
- Cpt = Captain
- Lt = Lieutenant

=== Other ===
- w = wounded
- mw = mortally wounded
- k = killed

== Military Division of the Mississippi ==
MG William T. Sherman

Headquarters

- Chief of Artillery: BG William F. Barry
- Chief of Staff: Col Joseph D. Webster

Escort

- 7th Company, Ohio Sharpshooters: Lt William McCory

== Army of the Cumberland ==
MG George Henry Thomas

Headquarters

- Chief of Staff: BG William D. Whipple
- Chief of Artillery: BG John M. Brannan

=== IV Corps ===
MG David S. Stanley

| Division | Brigade | Regiments and Others |
|---|---|---|
| First Division; BG Nathan Kimball | 1st Brigade Col Isaac M. Kirby | 21st Illinois; 38th Illinois; 31st Indiana: Col John Thomas Smith; 81st Indiana; 90th Ohio; 101st Ohio |
| First Division; BG Nathan Kimball | 2nd Brigade Col Jacob E. Taylor | 96th Illinois; 115th Illinois: Col Jesse Hale Moore; 35th Indiana; 21st Kentucky; 51st Ohio |
| First Division; BG Nathan Kimball | 3rd Brigade BG William Grose | 75th Illinois; 84th Illinois; 9th Indiana; 30th Indiana; 36th Indiana; 84th Indiana; 77th Pennsylvania |
| First Division; BG Nathan Kimball | Artillery Cpt Theodore Thomasson | 5th Indiana Light Battery; Battery B, Pennsylvania Light |
| Second Division; BG John Newton | 1st Brigade Col Emerson Opdyke | 36th Illinois; 73rd Illinois; 88th Illinois; 44th Indiana; 24th Wisconsin |
| Second Division; BG John Newton | 2nd Brigade BG George D. Wagner | 100th Illinois; 40th Indiana; 51st Indiana; 57th Indiana; 28th Kentucky; 26th Ohio; 97th Ohio |
| Second Division; BG John Newton | 3rd Brigade BG Luther P. Bradley | 42nd Illinois; 51st Illinois; 79th Illinois; 3rd Kentucky; 64th Ohio; 65th Ohio; 125th Ohio |
| Second Division; BG John Newton | Artillery Cpt Wilbur Goodspeed | Battery M, 1st Illinois Light; Battery A, 1st Ohio Light |
| Third Division; BG Thomas J. Wood | 1st Brigade Col Charles T. Hotchkiss | 89th Illinois; 8th Kansas; 15th Ohio; 49th Ohio; 15th Wisconsin |
| Third Division; BG Thomas J. Wood | 2nd Brigade Col Philip S. Post | 59th Illinois; 41st Ohio; 71st Ohio; 93rd Ohio; 124th Ohio |
| Third Division; BG Thomas J. Wood | 3rd Brigade Col Frederick Knefler | 79th Indiana; 86th Indiana; 9th Kentucky; 17th Kentucky; 13th Ohio; 19th Ohio; 59th Ohio |
| Third Division; BG Thomas J. Wood | Artillery Cpt Cullen Bradley | Bridges' Illinois Light Battery; 6th Ohio Light Battery |

=== XIV Corps ===
BG Jefferson C. Davis

| Division | Brigade | Regiments and Others |
|---|---|---|
| First Division; BG William Passmore Carlin | 1st Brigade Col Marion Taylor | 104th Illinois; 42nd Indiana; 88th Indiana; 15th Kentucky; 33rd Ohio; 21st Wisconsin: Maj Michael H. Fitch |
| First Division; BG William Passmore Carlin | 2nd Brigade Maj John R. Edie | 15th U.S. Infantry (6 companies): Cpt Horace Jewett; 15th U.S. Infantry (9 companies): Cpt William S. McManus; 16th U.S. Infantry (4 companies): Cpt R. Peabody Barry; 18th U.S. Infantry (8 companies): Cpt Lymann M. Kellogg (w), Cpt Robert Hull; 19th U.S. Infantry (5 companies): Cpt James Mooney |
| First Division; BG William Passmore Carlin | 3rd Brigade Col Marshall F. Moore | 37th Indiana; 38th Indiana; 21st Ohio; 69th Ohio; 74th Ohio; 78th Pennsylvania; 79th Pennsylvania; 1st Wisconsin |
| First Division; BG William Passmore Carlin | Artillery Cpt Lucius Drury | 1st Illinois Light Battery; Battery I, 1st Ohio |
| Second Division; BG James D. Morgan | 1st Brigade Col Charles M. Lum | 16th Illinois; 60th Illinois; 10th Michigan; 14th Michigan: Col Henry R. Mizner; 17th New York |
| Second Division; BG James D. Morgan | 2nd Brigade Col John G. Mitchell | 34th Illinois; 78th Illinois; 98th Ohio; 109th Ohio; 113th Ohio; 121st Ohio |
| Second Division; BG James D. Morgan | 3rd Brigade Col Caleb J. Dilworth (w) Sept 1 Ltc James W. Langley | 85th Illinois; 86th Illinois; 110th Illinois; 125th Illinois: Ltc James W. Langley; 22nd Indiana; 52nd Ohio |
| Second Division; BG James D. Morgan | Artillery Cpt Charles Barnett | Battery I, 2nd Illinois Light; 2nd Minnesota Battery (detachment); 5th Wisconsin Light Battery |
| Third Division; BG Absalom Baird | 1st Brigade Col Moses B. Walker | 82nd Indiana: Col Morton C. Hunter; 23rd Missouri; 17th Ohio; 31st Ohio; 89th Ohio; 92nd Ohio: Col Benjamin D. Fearing |
| Third Division; BG Absalom Baird | 2nd Brigade Col Newell Gleason | 75th Indiana; 87th Indiana; 101st Indiana; 2nd Minnesota; 105th Ohio |
| Third Division; BG Absalom Baird | 3rd Brigade Col George P. Este (w) | 10th Indiana; 74th Indiana; 10th Kentucky; 14th Ohio; 38th Ohio |

=== Cavalry Corps ===
BG Washington Elliott, Chief of Cavalry, Army of the Cumberland

| Division | Brigade | Regiments and Others |
|---|---|---|
| Second Division; BG Kenner Garrard | 1st Brigade Col Robert Minty | 4th Michigan Cavalry; 7th Pennsylvania Cavalry; 4th U.S. Cavalry |
| Second Division; BG Kenner Garrard | 2nd Brigade Col Beroth Bullard Eggleston | 1st Ohio Cavalry; 3rd Ohio Cavalry; 4th Ohio Cavalry |
| Second Division; BG Kenner Garrard | 3rd Brigade Col Abram O. Miller | 98th Illinois Mounted Infantry; 123rd Illinois Mounted Infantry; 17th Indiana Mounted Infantry; 72nd Indiana Mounted Infantry |
| Second Division; BG Kenner Garrard | Artillery | Chicago Board of Trade Battery |
| Third Division; BG Judson Kilpatrick | 1st Brigade Ltc Robert Klein | 3rd Indiana Cavalry; 5th Iowa Cavalry |
| Third Division; BG Judson Kilpatrick | 2nd Brigade Ltc Fiedler A. Jones | 8th Indiana Cavalry; 2nd Kentucky Cavalry; 10th Ohio Cavalry |
| Third Division; BG Judson Kilpatrick | 3rd Brigade Col Eli Murray | 92nd Illinois Mounted Infantry; 3rd Kentucky Cavalry; 5th Kentucky Cavalry |
| Third Division; BG Judson Kilpatrick | Artillery | 10th Wisconsin Battery |

== Army of the Tennessee ==
MG Oliver O. Howard

=== XV Corps ===
MG John A. Logan

| Division | Brigade | Regiments and Others |
|---|---|---|
| First Division; BG Peter J. Osterhaus | 1st Brigade Col Milo Smith | 26th Iowa; 30th Iowa; 27th Missouri; 76th Ohio |
| First Division; BG Peter J. Osterhaus | 2nd Brigade Col James A. Williamson (w) Sept 1 | 4th Iowa; 9th Iowa; 25th Iowa; 31st Iowa |
| First Division; BG Peter J. Osterhaus | 3rd Brigade Col Hugo von Wangelin | 3rd Missouri; 12th Missouri; 17th Missouri; 29th Missouri; 31st Missouri; 32nd Missouri |
| First Division; BG Peter J. Osterhaus | Artillery Maj Clemens Landgraeber | Battery F, 2nd Missouri Light; 4th Ohio Light Battery |
| Second Division; BG William B. Hazen | 1st Brigade Col Theodore Jones | 55th Illinois; 116th Illinois; 6th Missouri; 8th Missouri; 30th Ohio; 57th Ohio |
| Second Division; BG William B. Hazen | 2nd Brigade Col Wells S. Jones | 83rd Indiana; 11th Illinois; 30th Ohio; 37th Ohio; 47th Ohio; 53rd Ohio; 54th Ohio |
| Second Division; BG William B. Hazen | Artillery Cpt Francis DeGress | Battery A, 1st Illinois Light; Battery B, 1st Illinois Light; Battery H, 1st Illinois Light |
| Fourth Division; BG William Harrow | 1st Brigade Col John M. Oliver | 12th Indiana; 48th Illinois; 90th Illinois; 99th Indiana; 15th Michigan; 70th Ohio |
| Fourth Division; BG William Harrow | 2nd Brigade BG Charles C. Walcutt | 26th Illinois; 40th Illinois; 100th Indiana; 103rd Illinois; 97th Indiana; 6th Iowa; 46th Ohio |

=== XVI Corps ===
BG Thomas E. G. Ransom

| Division | Brigade | Regiments and Others |
|---|---|---|
| Second Division; BG John M. Corse | 1st Brigade BG Elliott W. Rice | 52nd Illinois; 66th Indiana; 2nd Iowa; 7th Iowa |
| Second Division; BG John M. Corse | 2nd Brigade Col Robert N. Adams | 9th Illinois Mounted Infantry; 12th Illinois; 66th Illinois (Western Sharpshooters); 81st Ohio |
| Second Division; BG John M. Corse | 3rd Brigade Col Frederick J. Hurlbut | 7th Illinois; 50th Illinois; 57th Illinois; 39th Iowa |
| Second Division; BG John M. Corse | Artillery Capt Frederick Welker | Battery H, 1st Missouri Light Artillery |
| Fourth Division; BG John W. Fuller | 1st Brigade Ltc Henry T. McDowell | 64th Illinois; 18th Missouri; 27th Ohio; 39th Ohio |
| Fourth Division; BG John W. Fuller | 2nd Brigade BG John W. Sprague | 35th New Jersey; 43rd Ohio; 63rd Ohio; 25th Wisconsin |
| Fourth Division; BG John W. Fuller | 3rd Brigade Col John Tillson | 10th Illinois; 25th Indiana; 17th New York; 32nd Wisconsin |
| Fourth Division; BG John W. Fuller | Artillery Cpt Jerome B. Burrows | Battery C, 1st Michigan Light; 14th Ohio Light Battery; Battery F, 2nd U.S. Artillery |

=== XVII Corps ===
MG Francis P. Blair Jr.

| Division | Brigade | Regiments and Others |
|---|---|---|
| Third Division; BG Charles R. Woods | 1st Brigade Col George E. Bryant | 20th Illinois; 30th Illinois; 31st Illinois; 45th Illinois; 12th Wisconsin; 16th Wisconsin |
| Third Division; BG Charles R. Woods | 2nd Brigade Ltc Greenberry F. Wiles | 20th Ohio; 68th Ohio; 78th Ohio |
| Third Division; BG Charles R. Woods | 3rd Brigade Col Adam G. Malloy | 17th Wisconsin; Worden's Battalion; Detachment, 14th Wisconsin; Detachment, 81st Illinois; Detachment, 95th Illinois |
| Third Division; BG Charles R. Woods | Artillery Cpt William S. Williams | Battery D, 1st Illinois Light; Battery H, 1st Michigan Light; 3rd Ohio Battery |
| Fourth Division; BG Giles A. Smith | 1st Brigade Col Benjamin F. Potts | 32nd Illinois; 23rd Indiana; 53rd Indiana; 3rd Iowa (3 companies); 32nd Ohio |
| Fourth Division; BG Giles A. Smith | 2nd Brigade Col John Logan | 14th Illinois; 15th Illinois; 32nd Illinois; 41st Illinois |
| Fourth Division; BG Giles A. Smith | 3rd Brigade BG William Worth Belknap | 11th Iowa; 13th Iowa; 15th Iowa; 16th Iowa |
| Fourth Division; BG Giles A. Smith | Artillery Cpt William Clayton | Battery F, 2nd Illinois Light; 1st Minnesota Battery; Battery C, 1st Missouri Light; 10th Ohio Light Battery; 15th Ohio Light Battery |
