= Amos Deason Home =

Historic house in Mississippi, United States

Coordinates: 31.609997°N 89.200293°W

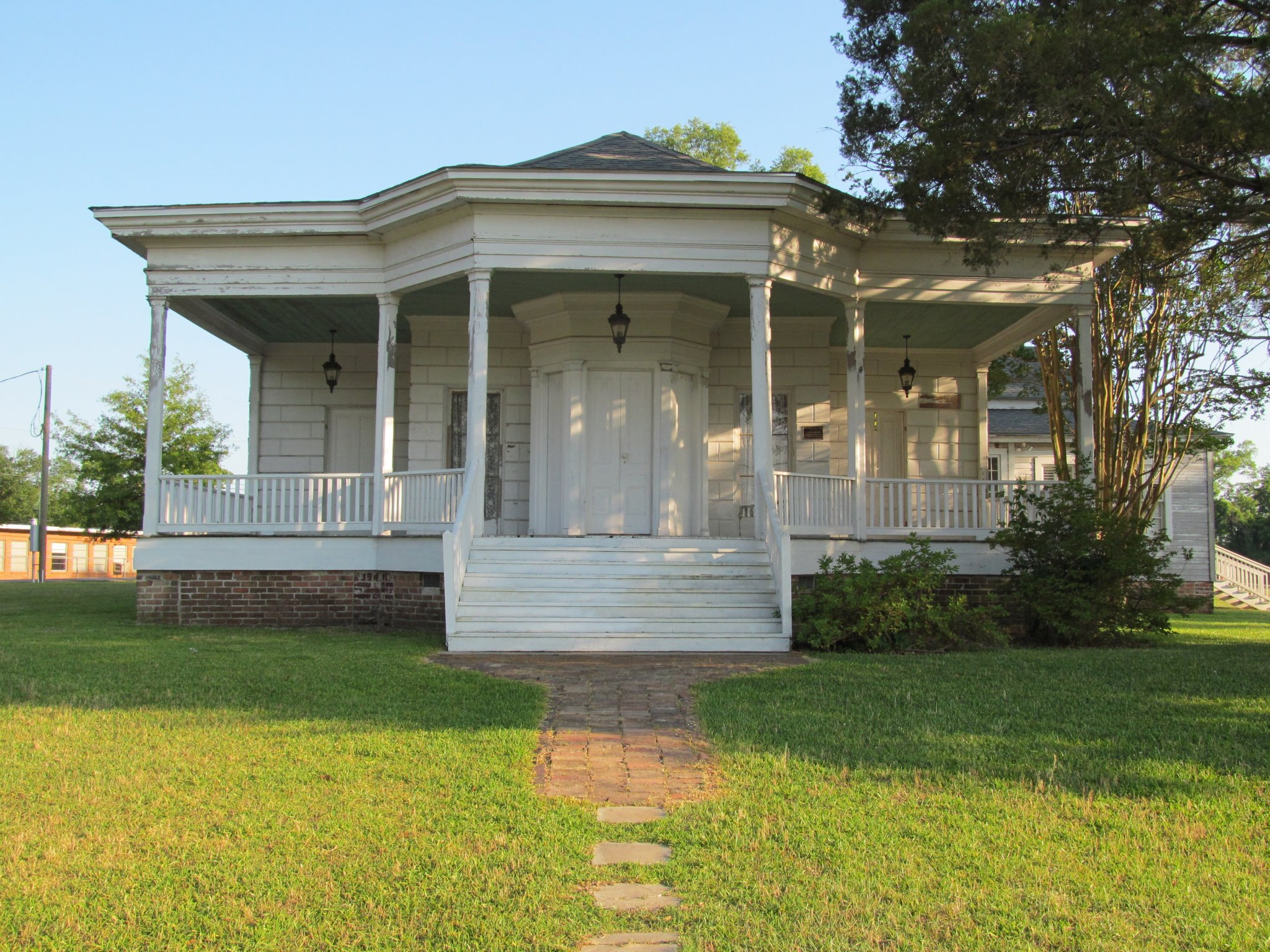
- Amos Deason Home in 2014
- Interactive map of Amos Deason Home
- Type: Historic home
- Location: 410 Anderson Street
- Nearest city: Ellisville, Mississippi

History
- Built: c. 1830s

The Amos Deason Home is located in Ellisville, Mississippi. Completed in 1845, it the oldest home in Jones County, Mississippi and is located at 410 Anderson Street.

== History ==
=== Construction ===
Actual construction of the house is believed to have started in the 1830s by Ed Chapman who died prior to completion. Boyles McManus is said to have completed the house later. However, the official date has been established as ca. 1845. It is an accepted fact that Amos and Eleanor Deason were the first family to occupy the house and original 700-acre homestead.

=== Features ===
The original house has two architectural features that are unique to this area and time period. First the exterior of the house appears to be made of stone. The planners employed a technique that George Washington had used at Mount Vernon to transform wood to the look of stone. Second is the front entrance to the house which has a uniquely hexagon shaped vestibule with French doors opening onto the porch. The doorway is flanked on each side by an angled side panel. It is believed the original panel contained partial glass.

==== Timbers ====
The house was built of hand-hewn timbers from the hearts of virgin pine forests that surrounded the property at the time. The heavy framework of the house was pinned together with wooden pegs. The weatherboards [siding] were heavy pine panel fastened by smaller wooden pins. No nails as we know them today were available. The full 1 1/2" thick weatherboards, twelve inches wide were hand beveled on all four sides and then crossed beveled at twelve-inch intervals to resemble blocks of masonry. The weatherboards were then painted [more like a whitewash]. an application of sand was applied to the wet paint, and then after drying a second coat of paint was affixed. This gave the exterior an appearance of unpolished limestone or granite rather than wood. The moldings, doors and trim were made on site by skilled craftsmen and indentured labor. Glass for windows and doors, hardware and other miscellaneous items had to be transported from Mobile. Bricks for the chimney were made from native clay and burned on the homestead.

==== Roof ====
The original roof structure was stripped with lathing and hand split wooden shake shingles were applied in an interlocking method to prevent leaks. One can still see the underside of the original lath and shingles from the attic.

==== Front porch ====
The original basic home consisted of a front porch styled to match the shape of the vestibule with six columns, partial wrap around porches, vestibule and four interior rooms.

- Parlor or front room primarily used for weddings and entertaining. This room had open fireplace that backed up to the fireplace in the master bedroom. Located adjacent to the left of the fireplace was a hidden passage, sometimes referred to as a safe spot.
- Master bedroom with fireplace which was occupied by Mr. and Mrs. Deason or special guests when spending the night. This bedroom had two window openings and a closet which was rare for the times. Closets were taxed as rooms and inside stairways were also taxed. This and lack of living space was the reason for most stairways being located on the outside of houses or buildings. The original closet ceiling was left open or ceiled with an opening to allow access to the attic. The closet walls were sealed with the same wide planks as the bedroom. This bedroom is referred to as the "winter morning room" because of necessary warmth from the fireplace. This is also the room where the legendary murder of Major Amos McLemore occurred at the hand of Newt Knight on October 5, 1863.
- Two small bedrooms where the three girls slept. The original bedrooms each contained two windows and a door that opened onto the front porch.

==== Floors ====
Floors were made with various width select dressed boards that measured up to fourteen inches wide in some rooms. Interior walls were veiled with approximate 12-inch-wide dressed horizontal planks. The twelve feet high ceilings were covered with the same type materials as the walls except the edges were beveled on the sides of each plank to give a "V" groove appearance when the planks joined. The high ceilings provided essential relief against the sweltering Jones County summer heat. All rooms had thick 12" wide baseboards and ornate molding and trim around doors and windows.

All rooms were connected to the outside by a partial wrap around porch. There were no interior doors or doorways. To go from one room to another one had to go outside on the porch and then enter a door to the desired room.

==== Kitchen ====
Customary for the period the kitchen with a large fireplace was a separate structure located near the back of the house. Cooking was done over the open fireplace, and the family would also partake their meals in this building. The women of the household often used the kitchen for spinning, weaving, sewing, quilting, etc. Other buildings in the small complex were said to include slave quarters, barn, smoke house, and others.

== Current ==
=== Location ===
Today nestled between two modern schools, the Deason Home of "French Raised Cottage" design at the corner of Deason and Anderson Streets in Ellisville, seems oddly misput in its current surroundings. Additions and modifications were made around 1890 when Amos Deason's grandson, Isaac Anderson Jr. and his wife Sarah Rebecca "Sallie" Pool, acquired the house after Eleanor Deason's death in 1888. Here they reared ten children, three of whom were born in the house. Today the basic structure of the house stands much as it did in the 1890s.

=== Notoriety ===
The home gained its notoriety for being haunted after Major Amos McLemore was assassinated in the home. McLemore, a Confederate officer was sent to Jones County to round up a group of deserters led by Newt Knight. A friend of the Deasons, Major McLemore was a guest in their home and was using the home as his headquarters while in the area. Knowing McLemore was in the area for the purpose of arresting the deserters, Newt Knight stormed the house one night, shooting McLemore in the back. The gravely injured man fell to the floor and bled profusely on the pine flooring. His blood saturated the floor and ran down the joists underneath. McLemore was taken home to Eastabuchie where he died a few days later. Try as she might, no amount of scrubbing by Mrs. Deason could remove the blood stains from the floor. Years passed and later residents of the home covered the original flooring with another floor, but the memory of this heinous act lingers. This bedroom has become known as the "Murder Room" and ghosts are said to haunt the home, giving it the reputation for being one of the most haunted homes in Mississippi. The blood stains can still be seen from under the home.

The home is now owned and operated by the Tallahala Chapter of the National Society Daughters of the American Revolution and is listed on the National Register of Historic Places. It is available for private tours and ghost hunts.
