= 14th Michigan Infantry Regiment =

- State Flag of Michigan
- Active: February 13, 1862, to July 18, 1865
- Country: United States
- Allegiance: Union
- Branch: Union Army
- Type: Infantry and Mounted Infantry
- Engagements: Atlanta campaign; Battle of Kennesaw Mountain; Battle of Jonesboro; March to the Sea; Battle of Bentonville

The 14th Michigan Infantry Regiment was an infantry regiment that served in the Union Army during the American Civil War.

== Service ==
- Organized at Ypsilanti and Detroit, Mich, Jan. 7-Feb. 18, 1862.
- Mustered in February 13, 1862
- Left State for St. Louis, Mo., April 17
- Moved to Pittsburg Landing, Tenn.
- Attached to 2nd Brigade, 1st Division, Army of Mississippi, to September, 1862.
- 2nd Brigade, 13th Division, Army of the Ohio, to November, 1862.
- 1st Brigade, 4th Division, Center 14th Army Corps, Army of the Cumberland, to January, 1863.
- 1st Brigade, 4th Division, 14th Army Corps, Cumberland, to June, 1863.
- 1st Brigade, 2nd Division, Reserve Corps, Cumberland, to October, 1863.
- 1st Brigade, 2nd Division, 14th Army Corps, Cumberland, to December, 1863.
- Columbia, Tenn., Dept. of the Cumberland, to May, 1864.
- 1st Brigade, 2nd Division, 14th Army Corps, Cumberland, to July, 1865.

== Detailed Service ==
- Advance on and Siege of Corinth, Miss., April 29 – May 30, 1862.
- Actions at Farmington, Miss., May 3 and 9.
- Reconnaissance toward Corinth May 8.
- Pursuit to Booneville May 31 – June 12.
- Reconnaissance toward Baldwyn June 3.
- Buell's operations along Memphis & Charleston Railroad in Northern Alabama and Middle Tennessee June 13 – July 18.
- At Tuscumbia, Ala., until September 1.
- March to Nashville, Tenn., September 1–6.
- Duty there until December 26.
- Siege of Nashville September 12 – November 7.
- Near Nashville November 5.
- Near La Vergne November 7.
- Advance on Murfreesboro December 26–30.
- Guard trains to Murfreesboro January 2–3, 1863.
- Duty at Murfreesboro until March 8.
- At Brentwood until July 3 guarding line between Nashville and Franklin.
- Duty at Nashville, Franklin and Columbia until May, 1864.
- Action at Weem's Springs August 19, 1863 (Co. "C").
- Regiment mounted September 8, 1863, and armed with Spencer Carbines.
- Engaged in scout and patrol duty through Lawrence, Giles and Maury Counties, operating against guerrillas of that section.
- Action at Lawrenceburg, Tenn., November 4, 1863.
- Specially complimented by General Gordon Granger in General Order No. 38, dated November 8, 1863, for efficient services.
- March to Join Sherman at Dallas, Ga., May 21 – June 4, 1864.
- Atlanta Campaign June 4 to September 8, 1864.
- Operations about Marietta and against Kenesaw Mountain June 10 – July 2.
- Pine Hill June 11–14.
- Lost Mountain June 15–17.
- Assault on Kenesaw June 27.
- Ruff's Station July 4.
- Chattahoochee River July 5–17.
- Peach Tree Creek July 19–20.
- Siege of Atlanta July 22 – August 25.
- Utoy Creek August 5–7.
- Flank movement on Jonesboro August 25–30.
- Battle of Jonesboro August 31 – September 1.
- Operations against Hood in North Georgia and North Alabama September 29 – November 3.
- March to the sea November 15 – December 10.
- Siege of Savannah December 10–21.
- Campaign of the Carolinas January to April, 1865.
- Averysboro, N. C., March 16.
- Battle of Bentonville March 19–21.
- Occupation of Goldsboro March 24.
- Advance on Raleigh April 10–14.
- Occupation of Raleigh April 14.
- Bennett's House April 26.
- Surrender of Johnston and his army.
- March to Washington, D.C., via Richmond, Va., April 29 – May 19.
- Grand Review May 24.
- Moved to Louisville, Ky., June 13.
- Mustered out July 18, 1865.

== Total strength and casualties ==
The regiment suffered 1 officer and 58 enlisted men who were killed in action or mortally wounded and 3 officers and 184 enlisted men who died of disease, for a total of 246 fatalities.

== Commanders ==
- Colonel Henry Rutgeras Mizner

== See also ==
- List of Michigan Civil War Units
- Michigan in the American Civil War
