= Jacob H. Sharp =

American politician

Jacob Hunter Sharp
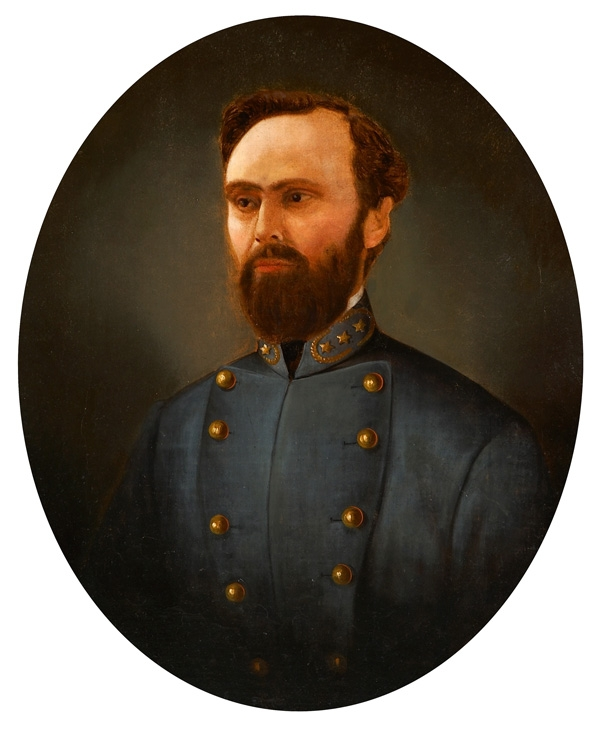

41st Speaker of the Mississippi House of Representatives

Member of the Mississippi House of Representatives
- In office January 1886 – January 1888
- Preceded by: William M. Inge
- Succeeded by: Charles B. Mitchell

Member of the Mississippi House of Representatives from the Lowndes County district
- In office January 1900 – January 1904
- In office January 1886 – January 1892 Serving with 1890-1892: T. B. Bradford, L. D. Landrum; 1888-1890: M. M. Burke, J. H. Simmons; 1886-1888: James T. Harrison, J. H. Simmons
- Preceded by: James T. Harrison; W. H. Cook; A. H. Myers

Personal details
- Born: February 6, 1833 Pickensville, Alabama
- Died: September 15, 1907 (aged 74) Columbus, Mississippi
- Resting place: Friendship Cemetery

Military service
- Allegiance: United States of America; Confederate States of America
- Branch/service: Confederate States Army
- Years of service: 1861–65
- Rank: Brigadier General
- Unit: Army of Tennessee
- Commands: 44th Mississippi Infantry; Sharp's Brigade
- Battles/wars: American Civil War: Battle of Shiloh; Kentucky Campaign; Battle of Murfreesboro; Battle of Chickamauga; Chattanooga Campaign; Battle of Missionary Ridge; Atlanta campaign; Franklin-Nashville Campaign; Carolinas campaign

Jacob Hunter Sharp (February 6, 1833 – September 15, 1907) was a Mississippi lawyer, newspaperman and politician, as well as a general in the Confederate States Army during the American Civil War. He played a prominent role of several major engagements of the Army of Tennessee in the Western Theater, including the Atlanta campaign in 1864 where he was several times recognized by his commanders and peers for bravery in combat. After the war, he also served in the Mississippi House of Representatives and was its Speaker from 1886 to 1888.

== Early life and career ==
Jacob Sharp was born in Pickensville, Alabama, to Elisha Hunter Sharp and his wife, Sallie (Carter) Hunt, who originally hailed from Hertford County, North Carolina. His mother was the daughter of former military officer Major Isaac Carter. His brother Thomas L. Sharp would become an antebellum Mississippi State Senator and a colonel in the Confederate Army during the Civil War. He would be killed in action at the Battle of Atlanta in 1864.

As a young child, Sharp moved with this family to Lowndes County, Mississippi. At the age of fifteen, he returned to Pickens County, Alabama, in 1850 and later graduated from the University of Alabama. While attending The University of Alabama, he joined the Alpha Delta Phi fraternity. He subsequently returned to Columbus, Mississippi after graduation, and became an attorney. He married Miss Harris of Mississippi, a daughter of Judge Harris.

== Civil War service ==
At the start of the Civil War, Sharp enlisted in the 1st Mississippi Battalion, which was later consolidated into the 44th Mississippi Infantry (initially known as Blythe's Regiment). He rose through the ranks from private to captain and participated in the Battle of Shiloh, Bragg's Kentucky Campaign, and the Battle of Murfreesboro. Promoted to colonel in August 1863, he led a brigade following the promotion of Brig. Gen. Patton Anderson and was in command of it at Chickamauga and the Battle of Missionary Ridge.

During the 1864 Atlanta Campaign, General Anderson wrote in his official report on the Battle of Jonesboro, "Sharp's gallant Mississippians could be seen pushing their way in small parties up to the very slope of the enemy’s breastworks. Officers could be plainly observed encouraging the men to this work. One on horseback, whom I took to be General Sharp, was particularly conspicuous."

Sharp became a brigadier general on July 24, 1864, following the wounding of Brig. Gen. William F. Tucker at the Battle of Resaca and given command of the Fifth Brigade in Edward Johnson's division of Stephen D. Lee's corps of the Army of Tennessee.

He participated in the Franklin-Nashville Campaign later that year. In the assault during the Battle of Franklin on November 30, 1864, Johnson's Division charged the works after dark and Sharp's Brigade was distinguished in the desperate struggle, taking three Union battle flags and leaving their dead and wounded in the trenches and along the works. Sharp himself was wounded in the battle, but soon recovered. Following the Battle of Nashville in December, the defeated Army of Tennessee recrossed the Tennessee River on December 26. Sharp's Brigade was then furloughed until February 12, 1865, when they were reactivated. In April 1865, he and his men surrendered at Bennett Place following the Carolinas campaign.

== Postbellum activities ==
After the war ended later that year, Sharp returned home and resumed his legal career. During the Reconstruction period, he was involved in white supremacy efforts and led the Lowndes County chapter of the Ku Klux Klan. He also became a newspaper editor, becoming the owner of the Columbus Independent in 1879. In 1885, he was elected to represent Lowndes County in the Mississippi House of Representatives for the 1886-1888 term. He was re-elected in 1887 for the 1888-1890 term, and again in 1889 for the 1890-1892 term. During the 1886-1888 term, he served as the House's Speaker. He served again in the House in the 1900-1904 term.

Sharp died in Columbus, Mississippi, and is buried there in Friendship Cemetery.

== See also ==
- List of American Civil War generals (Confederate)
