= 44th Mississippi Infantry Regiment =

- Active: 1861-1865
- Country: Confederate States of America
- Allegiance: Mississippi
- Branch: Confederate States Army
- Type: Infantry
- Size: Regiment
- Battles: American Civil War: Battle of Belmont; Battle of Shiloh; Battle of Munfordville; Battle of Stones River; Battle of Chickamauga; Atlanta Campaign; Franklin-Nashville Campaign; Carolinas Campaign

Commanders
- Notable commanders: Jacob H. Sharp

The 44th Mississippi Infantry Regiment was an infantry unit of the Confederate States Army. Initially known as the 1st Battalion, Mississippi Infantry, then Blythe's Regiment, the name was changed to the 44th Regiment in June, 1863. Consisting of volunteer companies assembled in the summer of 1861, the 44th Infantry fought in many of the major battles of the Western theater of the American Civil War, suffering heavy losses before surrendering in April 1865.

== History ==
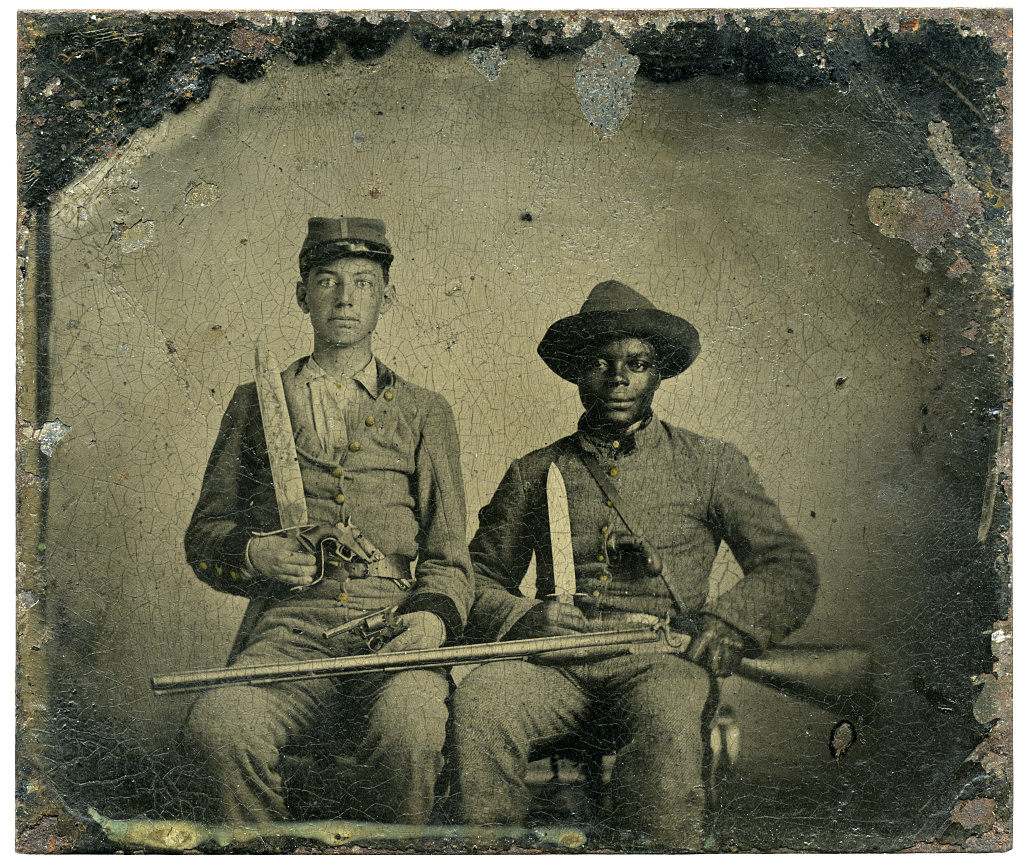
Sergeant Andrew Martin Chandler (left), Company F, 44th Mississippi, and Silas Chandler (right), an enslaved man. Both men survived the war.

The unit that became the 44th Regiment was initially formed as the 1st Infantry Battalion from a group of Mississippi volunteer companies recruited in the summer of 1861 and organized to serve under Confederate General Gideon Johnson Pillow in Tennessee. The commanding officer of the 1st Battalion was Colonel A.K. Blythe; additional companies were added in the fall of 1861 and the battalion was upgraded to a regiment, referred to as "Blythe's Mississippi Regiment" until it was given the official designation as the 44th Mississippi Infantry Regiment in June, 1863.

As part of General Leonidas Polk's force, the 1st Battalion helped defeat an advance by Union General Ulysses S. Grant in Missouri at the Battle of Belmont in November 1861. Upgraded to regimental size, Blythe's Mississippians then joined the Battle of Shiloh in April 1862, where they came under heavy fire on the morning of the first day of the battle. Colonel Blythe and Lieutenant Colonel David L. Herron were killed, in a report after the battle General Benjamin F. Cheatham described the incident: "Blythe's Mississippi advanced to the left and attacked the enemy, and, wheeling to the right, drove one of the enemy's batteries, with its support, from its position; but as it advanced upon the enemy Colonel Blythe was shot dead from his horse while gallantly leading his regiment forward to the charge....This regiment at all time eminently manifested the high spirit which has always characterized the soldiers of Mississippi and no braver soldier than its heroic leader was lost to our cause."

The regiment fought at the Battle of Munfordville, Kentucky in September, 1862, and took further losses during an attack on a fortified Union position. Acting commander Lieutenant Colonel James Moore was killed, along with 3 others from the regiment and 30 wounded.

At the Battle of Stones River from December 31, 1862 – January 2, 1863 the regiment fought as part of General James Ronald Chalmers's brigade, once again taking casualties under heavy fire.

On June 6, 1863, the Regiment was renamed the 44th Mississippi. Jacob H. Sharp of the 44th was promoted to colonel and given command of a brigade of Mississippi regiments during the Battle of Chickamauga and the subsequent Atlanta Campaign. Command of the 44th then passed to Lieutenant Colonel R.G. Kelsey. Losses at Chickamauga were heavy, with the regiment suffering a 30% casualty rate, and at the Battle of Ezra Church outside Atlanta in July, Col. Sharp reported that the 44th took nearly 50% casualties.

In the fall of 1864, the 44th fought at Franklin and Battle of Nashville in Tennessee before retreating into Mississippi at the end of the year. At Franklin Sharp's Mississippi brigade distinguished itself by charging Union defenses and capturing 3 stands of regimental colors.

In early 1865 the 44th was sent to take part in the Carolinas Campaign. Depleted by heavy losses, during the final stages of the war the 44th was combined with remnants of the 10th Mississippi and 9th Infantry Battalion. The army in North Carolina surrendered on April 26, 1865, at Durham.

== Commanders ==
Commanders of the 44th Mississippi Infantry:

- Col. A.K. Blythe, killed at Shiloh.
- Col. Jacob H. Sharp, promoted to brigade commander.
- Lt. Col. David L. Herron, killed at Shiloh.
- Lt. Col. James Moore, killed at Munfordville.
- Lt. Col. R.G. Kelsey

== Organization ==
Companies of the 44th Mississippi Infantry:

- Company A, "Tombigbee Rangers", of Lowndes County.
- Company B, "Mississippi Swampers" of Coahoma County.
- Company C
- Company D
- Company E, "Blythe Rifles" of Yalobusha County
- Company F, "Palo Alto Confederates/Guards" of Chickasaw County
- Company G
- Company H, "Pettus Rangers"
- Company I
- Company K, "Amite Rangers"
- Company L, "Tom Weldon Rebels" of Adams County.

== See also ==
- List of Confederate units from Mississippi in the American Civil War
