= List of American Civil War generals (Confederate) =

Collar and cuff insignia of a Confederate general. All generals wore the same insignia regardless of grade.

== Confederate generals ==
Confederate States Army generals:	A	B	C	D	E	F	G	H	I	J	K	L	M	N	O	P	Q	R	S	T	U	V	W	X	Y	Z

- Assigned to duty by E. Kirby Smith
- Incomplete appointments
- State militia generals

The Confederate and United States processes for appointment, nomination and confirmation of general officers were essentially the same. The military laws of the United States required that a person be nominated as a general officer by the president and be confirmed by the Senate and that his commission be signed and sealed by the president.

Despite legal interpretations that would preclude posthumous confirmation of appointments or delivery of commissions, the U.S. Senate and the Confederate Senate confirmed a few appointments of officers known to be dead and did not recall or revoke a few other confirmed appointments for officers who had recently died or died before receiving their commissions. No brevet appointments were made in the Confederate States Army but twenty acting or temporary general officers were authorized by and appointed under Confederate States law. At least one State militia (Virginia) had at least one brevet general (Francis Henney Smith).

Although not as prevalent as in the Union Army, some dates of rank in the Confederate States Army were before the date of appointment or commission. Under an Act of September 1, 1861, the Confederate Congress permitted Confederate President Jefferson Davis to make recess appointments and nominations subject to Confederate Senate confirmation during the next term. Confederate Senate confirmation of general officer appointments was usually prompt early in the war but often was delayed in the last two years of the war.

Details concerning Confederate officers who were appointed to duty as generals late in the war by General E. Kirby Smith in the Confederate Trans-Mississippi Department, who have been thought of as generals and exercised command as generals but who were not duly appointed and confirmed or commissioned, and state militia generals who had field commands in certain actions in their home states but were never given appointments or commissions in the Confederate States Army are in the List of American Civil War generals (Acting Confederate). Not all colonels or lower ranking officers who exercised brigade or division command at any time are in this list but those most often erroneously referred to as generals are. A few acting or temporary Confederate generals were duly appointed and confirmed as such. The full entries for these officers are in this list.

The notes mainly show pre-war military education or experience, pre-war political office, ranks and appointments prior to general officer appointments, some major assignments or events, information on wounds, killed in action or otherwise during the war, a few close relationships, deaths soon after the war, several of the longest lived generals and Spanish–American War service. As noted above official CS rank was shown as a collar insignia of three stars within a wreath for all grades of general officers; there were exceptions to this rule: Robert E. Lee always wore rank insignia of a colonel (three stars without a wreath); Benjamin McCulloch always disliked army uniforms and was wearing a black velvet civilian suit and Wellington boots at the time of his death; Joseph L. Hogg died of disease before he could put on a uniform.
Abbreviations and notes:

- Rank column: conf. = date appointment confirmed by Confederate Senate; nom. = date nominated by Confederate President Jefferson Davis; rank = date of rank
- USMA = United States Military Academy at West Point, New York;
- South Carolina Military Academy = Predecessor to The Citadel at Charleston, South Carolina;
- VMI = Virginia Military Institute at Lexington, Virginia
- Additional notes: ranks: lt. = lieutenant

== A ==
Image	Name	Rank	Notes
	Adams, Daniel Weisiger	Brigadier general rank, nom: May 23, 1862 conf: September 30, 1862	Mississippi state senator, 1852–1856.; Brother of William Wirt Adams.; 1st Louisiana Infantry: lieutenant colonel, March 13, 1861, colonel, October 30, 1861.; Lost right eye at Shiloh.; Wounded: Perryville, Stones River.; Wounded, captured at Chickamauga.; Exchanged 1864.
	Adams, John	Brigadier general rank: December 29, 1862 nom: January 9, 1863 re-nom: May 23, 1863 conf: February 17, 1864	USMA, 1846.; Mexican–American War.; Resigned as captain, U.S. Army, May 31, 1861.; Appointed captain of cavalry in command at Memphis, August 27, 1861. Colonel, May 1862.; Killed at Franklin, aged 39.
	Adams, William Wirt	Brigadier general rank: September 25, 1863 nom: September 28, 1863 conf: January 25, 1864	Army of Republic of Texas.; Mississippi legislator, 1858, 1860.; Brother of Daniel Weisiger Adams.; 1st Mississippi Cavalry: colonel, October 16, 1861.
	Alexander, Edward Porter	Brigadier general (Artillery) rank: February 26, 1864 nom: March 1, 1864 conf: May 28, 1864 (Artillery) conf: June 10, 1864.	USMA, 1857.; Resigned as 2nd lieutenant, U.S. Army, May 1, 1861.; Captain, then major, July 1, 1861, engineers.; Chief of ordnance, Army of Northern Virginia; Chief of Artillery, Longstreet's Corps.; Wounded at Gettysburg, Petersburg.
	Allen, Henry Watkins	Brigadier general rank, nom: August 19, 1863 conf: January 25, 1864	Texas War of Independence.; Louisiana legislator.; 4th Louisiana Infantry: private, April 1861, lieutenant colonel, May 20, 1861, colonel, March 21, 1862.; Wounded at Shiloh; leg shattered at Baton Rouge, 1862.; Resigned as brigadier general, January 10, 1864.; Governor of Louisiana, January 25, 1864–June 2, 1865.
	Allen, William W.	Brigadier general (special) rank: February 26, 1864 nom: March 1, 1864 conf: June 9, 1864	Montgomery Mounted Rifles, 1st lieutenant, April 1861.; 1st Alabama Cavalry: major, December 11, 1861, colonel, July 11, 1862.; Wounded at Perryville, Stones River and Waynesboro, Georgia.; Appointed major general (temporary rank), March 4, 1865, but Senate did not act on nomination.
	Anderson, George Burgwyn	Brigadier general rank, nom: June 9, 1862 conf: September 30, 1862.	USMA, 1852; Resigned as 1st lieutenant, U.S. Army, April 25, 1861.; 4th North Carolina Infantry: colonel, July 16, 1861.; Wounded at Malvern Hill.; Mortally wounded at Antietam, September 17, 1862.; Died October 16, 1862, Raleigh, North Carolina, aged 31.
	Anderson, George T. "Tige"	Brigadier general rank, nom: November 1, 1862 conf. April 22, 1863	Mexican–American War.; Returned to U.S. Army May 3, 1855, captain, 1st U.S. Cavalry; Resigned as captain, U.S. Army, June 11, 1858.; 11th Georgia Infantry: colonel, July 2, 1861.; Severely wounded at Gettysburg.
	Anderson, James Patton	Brigadier general rank, nom: February 10, 1862 conf: April 22, 1863; Major general nom: February 11, 1864 rank, conf: February 17, 1864	Mississippi legislator.; Washington Territory marshal, delegate to U.S. Congress.; Mexican–American War: lieutenant colonel, Mississippi militia.; 1st Florida Infantry: colonel, April 1, 1861.; Severely wounded at Jonesboro, Georgia.
	Anderson, Joseph R.	Brigadier general rank, nom: September 3, 1861 conf: December 13, 1861	USMA, 1836.; Resigned as 2nd lieutenant, U.S. Army, July 1, 1837.; Superintendent, Tredegar Iron Works, Richmond, Virginia, 1841–1865.; Virginia legislator.; 6th Infantry Battalion, Local Defense troops, major, May 1861.; Major, artillery, August 27, 1861.; North Carolina Local Defense troops until April 19, 1862.; Wounded in forehead at Glendale.; Resigned as brigadier general, July 19, 1862, to resume control of Tredegar Iron Works.
	Anderson, Richard Heron "Fighting Dick"	Brigadier general rank, nom: July 18, 1861 conf: August 28, 1861; Major general rank, nom: July 14, 1862 conf: September 27, 1862; Lieutenant general (temporary) rank, nom: May 31, 1864 conf: June 1, 1864	USMA, 1842.; Mexican–American War.; Resigned as captain, U.S. Army, March 3, 1861.; Wounded at Antietam.; Promoted to lieutenant general with temporary rank after Longstreet was wounded at the Wilderness.; Reverted to major general on Longstreet's return to duty.
	Anderson, Robert H.	Brigadier general (temporary) rank, nom: July 26, 1864 conf: February 20, 1865	USMA, 1857.; Resigned as 2nd lieutenant, U.S. Army, May 17, 1861.; Special assistant to W.H.T. Walker, June 1861.; 5th Georgia Cavalry: colonel, January 20, 1863.; Wounded at Newnan, Georgia; Griswoldville, Georgia; Fayetteville, North Carolina.
	Anderson, Samuel Read	Brigadier general rank, nom: July 9, 1861 conf: August 18, 1861 rank: November 7, 1864 nom: November 15, 1864 conf: November 19, 1864	Mexican–American War.; Provisional Army of Tennessee, major general, May 9, 1861, aged 57.; Resigned as brigadier general, Spring 1862, due to ill health.; Brigadier general to rank from November 7, 1864, to head Tennessee conscription bureau.
	Archer, James J.	Brigadier general rank, nom: June 3, 1862 conf: September 30, 1862	Mexican–American War.; Returned to U.S. Army in 1855.; Resigned as captain, U.S. Army, May 14, 1861.; 5th Texas Infantry: colonel, October 2, 1861.; Wounded, captured, July 1, 1863, at Gettysburg.; Confined for over a year.; Exchanged August 3, 1864, health shattered.; Brief return to duty, summer 1864.; Died of pneumonia, October 24, 1864, Richmond, Virginia, aged 46.
	Armistead, Lewis Addison "Lo"	Brigadier general nom: March 29, 1862 rank, conf: April 1, 1862	Dismissed from USMA but nonetheless appointed to U.S. Army in 1839.; Wounded in Mexican–American War.; Resigned as captain, U.S. Army, May 6, 1861.; 57th Virginia Infantry: colonel, September 25, 1861.; Commanded a brigade in Pickett's division.; Wounded at Sharpsburg.; Mortally wounded during Pickett's Charge, Gettysburg, July 3, 1863.; Died at a Union Army field hospital, July 5, 1863 aged 46.
	Armstrong, Frank Crawford	Brigadier general rank: January 20, 1863 nom: January 23, 1863 conf: April 23, 1863	Fought with Union Army at First Manassas.; Resigned from Union Army on August 13, 1861, and joined Confederate Army.
	Ashby, Turner		See incomplete appointments section in List of American Civil War generals (Acting Confederate).: Warner lists as a general; Eicher does not.
	Atchison, David Rice	Brigadier general Rank: July, 1861; Resigned April 23, 1862.	Fought with Confederate Army and militia troops at Carthage, MO, and Pea Ridge, AR.; April 1862 Atchison resigned from the army over reported strategy arguments with General Price and moved to Texas for the duration of the Civil War.

== B ==
Image	Name	Rank	Notes
	Baker, Alpheus	Brigadier general rank: March 5, 1864 nom: March 7, 1864 conf: May 11, 1864	7th Alabama Infantry: private, 1861, captain, 1861, lieutenant colonel, January 2, 1862.; 54th Alabama Infantry: colonel, January 28, 1862.; Captured at Island #10.; Exchanged September 1862.; Severely wounded at Baker's Creek.; Wounded at Ezra Church.
	Baker, Laurence S.	Brigadier general rank: July 23, 1863 nom: July 30, 1863 conf: February 16, 1864	USMA, 1851; 1st North Carolina Cavalry: lieutenant colonel, May 8, 1861, colonel, March 1, 1862.; Wounded at Gettysburg, Brandy Station and in North Carolina, 1864.
	Baldwin, William Edwin	Brigadier general rank: September 19, 1862 nom: September 26, 1862 conf: October 3, 1862	Mississippi militia company: lieutenant, 12 years.; 14th Mississippi Infantry: captain, May 2, 1861, colonel, May 1861.; Captured at Fort Donelson.; Prisoner until August 1862.; Wounded, captured at Vicksburg.; Exchanged October 13, 1863.; Died after fall from a horse due to a broken stirrup, February 19, 1864, near Dog River Factory, Alabama, aged 36.
	Barksdale, William	Brigadier general rank, nom: August 12, 1862 conf: September 30, 1862	Mexican–American War.; U.S. Representative from Mississippi, 1852–1861.; Quartermaster general of Mississippi.; 13th Mississippi Infantry: colonel, May 14, 1861.; Mortally wounded during assault on the Peach Orchard on second day at Gettysburg, July 2, 1863.; Died July 3, 1863 aged 41.
	Barringer, Rufus	Brigadier general nom: May 30, 1864 rank, conf: June 1, 1864	North Carolina legislator, 1848, 1850.; 1st North Carolina Cavalry: still captain at Gettysburg, major, August 28, 1863, lieutenant colonel, October 17, 1863.; Captured at Namozine Church, April 3, 1865.
	Barry, John D.		See incomplete appointments section in List of American Civil War generals (Acting Confederate). Warner lists as a general; Eicher does not.
	Barton, Seth M.	Brigadier general rank: March 11, 1862 nom: March 14, 1862 conf: March 18, 1862	USMA, 1849; Resigned as captain, U.S. Army, June 10, 1861.; 3rd Arkansas Infantry: lieutenant colonel, July 8, 1861.; Captured in Vicksburg Campaign.; Paroled and exchanged, July 13, 1863.; Bravery unquestioned; criticized by Pickett, at New Bern, and Ransom, at Drewry's Bluff; relieved of command.; Assigned a brigade in the Richmond defenses.; Captured at Sailor's Creek.
	Bate, William Brimage	Brigadier general nom: September 26, 1862 rank, conf: October 3, 1862; Major general rank: February 23, 1864 nom: March 5, 1864 conf: May 11, 1864	Mexican–American War.; Tennessee legislator, 1860.; 2nd Tennessee Infantry: colonel, April 27, 1861.; Severely wounded at Shiloh.; Wounded 3 times.
	Battle, Cullen A.	Brigadier general rank: August 20, 1863 nom: August 25, 1863 conf: February 17, 1864	3rd Alabama Infantry: major, April 28, 1861, lieutenant colonel, July 31, 1861, colonel, May 31, 1862.; Severely injured by a horse falling on him before Chancellorsville.; Badly wounded and incapacitated for further field service at Cedar Creek.
	Beale, Richard Lee Turberville	Brigadier general rank: January 6, 1865 nom: January 7, 1865 conf: January 13, 1865	U.S. Representative, March 4, 1847–March 3, 1849.; State senator, 1855–1860.; 9th Virginia Cavalry: 1st lieutenant, April 1861, captain, July 1861, major, October 1861, lieutenant colonel, April 1862, Colonel, September 15, 1862.; Wounded 3 times.
	Beall, William N.R.	Brigadier general rank: April 11, 1862 nom: April 12, 1862 conf: April 17, 1862	USMA, 1848.; Resigned as captain, U.S. Army, August 20, 1861.; Surrendered, captured at Port Hudson.; Paroled in 1864 to act as a Confederate agent to supply Confederate prisoners of war with proceeds of cotton sales permitted to come through the federal blockade to New York City.; Released August 2, 1865.
	Beauregard, Pierre G.T. "Bory" "The Little Napoleon"	Brigadier general rank, nom, conf: March 1, 1861; General (PACS) rank, nom: July 21, 1861 conf: July 30, 1861; General (ACSA) rank: July 21, 1861 nom; conf: August 31, 1861	USMA, 1838.; Wounded in Mexican–American War.; Resigned as captain, U.S. Army, February 20, 1861.; Commanded Confederate troops at Fort Sumter, First Bull Run and at Shiloh after Albert Sidney Johnston death.; Abandoned Corinth, Mississippi, to large Union force.; Defended Charleston, South Carolina in 1863 and 1864.; Discerned and blocked U.S. Grant's move against Petersburg at end of Overland Campaign so Lee could catch up.
	Bee, Barnard E. Jr.	Colonel; Brigadier general rank: June 17, 1861 nom: June 17, 1861 conf: August 28, 1861 (posthumous)	USMA, 1845.; Wounded in Mexican–American War.; Brother of Hamilton Bee.; Resigned as captain, U.S. Army, March 3, 1861.; 1st South Carolina Regulars, artillery regiment, lieutenant colonel, June 1, 1861.; Posthumous confirmation of brigadier general promotion over a month after death.; Eicher, Warner list as a general.; Gave "Stonewall" Jackson his famous nickname at First Bull Run, where Bee was mortally wounded July 21, 1861, and died July 22, 1861 aged 36.
	Bee, Hamilton Prioleau	Brigadier general rank: March 4, 1862 nom: March 5, 1862 conf: March 6, 1862	Brother of Barnard Bee.; Wounded in Mexican–American War.; Speaker, Texas House of Representatives, one term.; Brigadier general of Texas militia, 1861.; In command at Brownsville, Texas, 1861.; Did mostly administrative work until Red River Campaign, where performance criticized.; Wounded in face at Pleasant Hill.
	Bell, Tyree H.	Brigadier general rank: February 28, 1865 nom, conf: March 2, 1865	12th Tennessee Infantry: captain, June 4, 1861, lieutenant colonel, June 5, 1861, colonel, June 17, 1862.; Cavalry commander under Forrest later in war.; Wounded at Shiloh and Pulaski, Tennessee.
	Benning, Henry L. "Old Rock"	Brigadier general rank: January 17, 1863 nom: January 23, 1863 conf: April 23, 1863	Six years as associate justice of Georgia Supreme Court.; 17th Georgia Infantry: colonel, August 29, 1861.; Wounded at the Wilderness.
	Benton, Samuel		See incomplete appointments section in List of American Civil War generals (Acting Confederate). Warner lists as a general; Eicher does not.
	Blanchard, Albert G.	Brigadier general rank, nom: September 21, 1861 conf: December 13, 1861	USMA, 1829.; Resigned as 1st lieutenant, U.S. Army, May 15, 1840.; Mexican–American War: captain, Louisiana Infantry, and major, 12th U.S. Infantry.; 1st Louisiana Infantry, colonel, April 28, 1861.; Mainly in instruction camps, on conscript duty and court of inquiry.; Dropped from C.S. Army on February 11, 1865.
	Boggs, William R.	Brigadier general rank, nom: November 4, 1862 conf: April 22, 1863	USMA, 1853.; Resigned as 1st lieutenant, U.S. Army, February 1, 1861.; Staff officer, engineer, 1861–1862: with Beauregard at Charleston, Bragg at Pensacola.; Resigned to join Georgia Militia, December 21, 1861.; Colonel CSA, engineers, July 14, 1862.; Chief of staff for E. Kirby Smith in the Trans–Mississippi Department.
	Bonham, Milledge Luke	Brigadier general rank: nom: April 23, 1861 conf: August 28, 1861 reappointed: rank: February 9, 1865 nom: February 16, 1865 conf: February 20, 1865	Seminole Wars.; Mexican–American War: major general, South Carolina militia; lieutenant colonel, 12th U.S. Infantry.; U.S. Representative, March 4, 1857– resigned December 29, 1860.; Resigned as brigadier general, January 17, 1862, to take seat in Confederate Congress.; Governor of South Carolina, December 18, 1862– December 18, 1864.; Reappointed brigadier general, February 9, 1865.
	Bowen, John Stevens	Brigadier general rank, nom: March 14, 1862 conf: March 18, 1862; Major general rank: May 25, 1863 died, unconfirmed	USMA, 1853.; Resigned as 2nd lieutenant, U.S. Army, May 1, 1856.; Georgia Militia, lieutenant colonel, for a year.; Captain, Missouri Militia.; Captured at Camp Jackson, Missouri, May 10, 1861.; 1st Missouri Infantry: colonel, June 11, 1861.; Wounded at Shiloh.; Paroled after surrender of Vicksburg, July 4, 1863.; Weakened by dysentery, died 9 days later, July 13, 1863, near Raymond, Mississippi, aged 32.; Died before Confederate Senate acted on major general nomination.
	Bragg, Braxton	Brigadier general rank, nom, conf: March 7, 1861; Major general rank, nom: September 12, 1861 conf: December 13, 1861; General (ACSA) rank: April 6, 1862 nom, conf: April 12, 1862	USMA, 1837.; Seminole Wars.; Mexican–American War.; Resigned as captain and brevet lieutenant colonel, U.S. Army, January 3, 1856.; Assigned to Gulf Coast.; Commanded Army of Tennessee, June 1862–November 1863.; Invaded Kentucky; defeated at Perryville; forced to withdraw from Murfreesboro after Stones River.; Victor at Chickamauga.; Grant forced retreat from Chattanooga.; Requested transfer of command to Joseph E. Johnston.; Charged with conduct of Confederate military operations.; Joined Joseph E. Johnston in North Carolina.
	Branch, Lawrence O'Bryan	Brigadier general rank, nom: November 16, 1861 conf: December 13, 1861	Aide in Florida War, 1841.; U.S. Representatives from North Carolina, March 4, 1855–March 3, 1861.; Quartermaster and Paymaster of North Carolina, May 20, 1861.; 33rd North Carolina Infantry: colonel, September 20, 1861.; Killed September 17, 1862, at Antietam aged 41.
	Brandon, William L.	Brigadier general rank, nom: June 18, 1864 conf: January 17, 1865	Pre-war state legislator.; Major general of Mississippi militia.; 21st Mississippi Infantry: major, June 11, 1861, lieutenant colonel, July 12, 1861, colonel, August 12, 1861.; Lost a leg at Malvern Hill.; Resigned October 28, 1863, but appointed brigadier general, June 18, 1864.; Put in command of recruiting for Mississippi.
	Brantley, William F.	Brigadier general (temporary) rank, nom: July 26, 1864 conf: February 21, 1865	15th, later 29th, Mississippi Infantry: captain, May 21, 1861, lieutenant colonel, May 1862, colonel, December 13, 1862.; Wounded at Shiloh and Stones River.
	Bratton, John "Reliable"	Brigadier general rank: May 6, 1864 nom: June 1, 1864 conf: June 9, 1864	6th South Carolina Infantry: private, 1861, captain, July 1861, lieutenant colonel, April 12, 1862, colonel, May 1, 1862.; Wounded at Williamsburg.; Wounded, captured at Seven Pines. Exchanged, early 1863.; Wounded at Darbytown Road, October 7, 1864.
	Breckinridge, John C.	Brigadier general rank, nom: November 2, 1861 conf: December 13, 1861; Major general rank: April 14, 1862 nom: April 16, 1862 conf: April 18, 1862	Mexican–American War.; Kentucky legislator, 1849–1851.; U.S. Representative, March 4, 1851–March 3, 1855.; In 1856, at age 35, elected U.S. Vice President (with President James Buchanan).; Resigned early to take seat in U.S. Senate 1859–1861.; Fled to Confederacy, October 2, 1861.; U.S. Senate declared him a traitor, December 2, 1861.; Commanded Reserve Corps at Shiloh.; Wounded at Cold Harbor, horse fell on him.; Commanded Department of Southwest Virginia, early 1864.; In Jubal Early's 1864 Shenandoah Valley Campaign and raid on Washington.; Appointed Confederate Secretary of War on February 4, 1865.
	Brevard Jr., Theodore W.		See incomplete appointments section in List of American Civil War generals (Acting Confederate). Warner lists as a general; Eicher does not.
	Brown, John Calvin	Brigadier general rank: August 30, 1862 nom: September 15, 1862 conf: September 30, 1862; Major general (temporary) rank, nom: August 4, 1864 conf: February 20, 1865	3rd Tennessee Infantry: private, colonel, May 16, 1861.; Captured at Fort Donelson. Exchanged August 15, 1862.; Wounded at Perryville and Ezra Church.; Severely wounded at Franklin.
	Browne, William M. "Constitution"		See incomplete appointments section in List of American Civil War generals (Acting Confederate). Warner lists as a general; Eicher does not (nomination rejected). Eicher lists in main section of commanders since acting secretary of state.
	Bryan, Goode	Brigadier general rank: August 29, 1863 nom: August 31, 1861 conf: February 17, 1864	USMA, 1834.; Resigned as 2nd lieutenant, U.S. Army, April 30, 1835.; Alabama legislator.; Mexican–American War: major, Alabama volunteers.; Georgia Militia, captain, 1853–1861.; 16th Georgia Infantry: captain, 1861, lieutenant colonel, July 19, 1861; colonel, February 15, 1862.; Resigned after Overland Campaign, September 20, 1864, due to failing health, aged 53.
	Buckner, Simon Bolivar	Brigadier general rank, nom: September 14, 1861 conf: December 13, 1861; Major general rank, nom: August 16, 1862 conf: September 27, 1862; Lieutenant general rank, nom: September 20, 1864 conf: January 17, 1865	USMA, 1844.; Mexican–American War (2 brevets; wounded).; Resigned as captain, U.S. Army, March 26, 1855.; Moved to Illinois; colonel, adjutant general, Illinois Militia, 1857.; Moved to Kentucky, captain, Kentucky Militia, 1858.; Left by Pillow and Floyd to surrender Fort Donelson.; Fortified Mobile.; Led a division in Longstreet's corps at Knoxville.; In Trans–Mississippi, chief of staff to E. Kirby Smith after Chickamauga.; Died January 8, 1914, Munfordville, Kentucky, aged 91.; Last survivor of 3 highest grades of general in Confederate States Army.
	Buford, Abraham	Brigadier general rank: September 2, 1862 nom: November 29, 1862 conf: April 22, 1863	USMA, 1841.; Mexican–American War.; Resigned as captain, U.S. Army, October 22, 1854.; Remained out of war while Kentucky remained neutral.; Two cousins were Union Army generals.; Joined C.S. Army as brigadier general.
	Bullock, Robert	Brigadier general (temporary) rank: November 29, 1864 nom: December 13, 1864 conf: January 17, 1865	Seminole War, 1856.; 7th Florida Infantry: captain, 1862, Major 1862, colonel, June 2, 1862.; Captured at Missionary Ridge.; Exchanged May 1864.; Wounded twice in Franklin–Nashville campaign.; Badly wounded in retreat after Nashville; captured.
	Butler, Matthew Calbraith	Brigadier general rank: September 1, 1863 nom: September 2, 1863 conf: February 17, 1864; Major general rank: September 19, 1864 nom: December 3, 1864 conf: December 7, 1864	Pre-war South Carolina legislator.; Hampton's Legion: captain, June 12, 1861; major, July 21, 1861.; 2nd South Carolina Cavalry: colonel, August 22, 1862.; Lost right foot at Brandy Station.; Major general U.S. Volunteers, 1898 through April 15, 1899, Spanish–American War.

== C ==
Image	Name	Rank	Notes
	Cabell, William L.	Brigadier general rank: January 20, 1863 nom: January 30, 1863 conf: April 23, 1863	USMA, 1850.; Resigned as captain, U.S. Army, April 20, 1861.; Chief quartermaster at First Bull Run.; Organized quartermaster corps at Richmond, 1861.; Cavalry commander.; Wounded twice.; Captured at Mine Creek, Kansas, during Price's 1864 Missouri Raid.; Prisoner, October 1864–August 1865.
	Campbell, Alexander William	Brigadier general rank: March 1, 1865 nom, conf: March 2, 1865	Mayor of Jackson, Tennessee, 1856.; Private, 1861, then major and assistant inspector general, Provisional Army of Tennessee.; 33rd Tennessee Infantry: colonel, October 18, 1861.; Severely wounded at Shiloh.; Captured at Lexington, Tennessee, July 1863, on a mission for governor.; Exchanged December 1864.
	Cantey, James	Brigadier general rank, nom: January 8, 1863 conf: April 22, 1863	Two-term South Carolina legislator.; Mexican–American War.; 15th Alabama Infantry: colonel, July 27, 1861.; Frequently in ill health.
	Capers, Ellison	Brigadier general rank: March 1, 1865 nom, conf: March 2, 1865	South Carolina Military Academy, 1857.; South Carolina Infantry, major, April 1861.; 24th South Carolina Infantry: lieutenant colonel, April 1, 1862, colonel, January 20, 1864.; Wounded three times.; Captured at Bentonville.
	Carroll, William Henry	Brigadier general rank, nom: October 26, 1861 conf: December 20, 1861	Eldest son of six-term governor of Tennessee, William Carroll.; 37th Tennessee Infantry:, colonel, July 9, 1861.; Proclaimed martial law in Knoxville, Tennessee.; Arrested by Hardee for drunkenness, incompetency and neglect.; Resigned February 1, 1863, and went to Canada.
	Carter, John C.	Colonel; Brigadier general (temporary) rank: July 7, 1864 nom: July 8, 1864 conf: February 20, 1865 (posthumous)	22nd Tennessee Infantry: 1st lieutenant, August 18, 1861.; 38th Tennessee Infantry: captain, September 23, 1861, major, 1861, lieutenant colonel, 1862, colonel, April 25, 1862.; Wounded at Perryville.; Mortally wounded at Franklin.; Died December 10, 1864, at the Harrison home, 3 miles (4.8 km) south of battlefield, aged 26.; Posthumous confirmation.; Eicher, Warner list as a general.
	Chalmers, James R.	Brigadier general nom: February 10, 1862 rank: February 13, 1862 conf: February 17, 1862 re-conf: February 7, 1864	9th Mississippi Infantry: colonel, March 27, 1861.; Wounded at Stones River and Collierville, Tennessee.
	Chambliss, John R.	Brigadier general (special) rank: December 19, 1863 nom: January 9, 1864 conf: January 27, 1864	USMA, 1853.; Resigned as brevet 2nd lieutenant, U.S. Army, March 4, 1854.; Militia officer, aide to Virginia governor.; 41st Virginia Infantry: colonel, May 1861.; 13th Virginia Cavalry: colonel, July 13, 1861.; Killed August 16, 1864, at engagement near Deep Bottom, Virginia, on Charles City Road.
	Cheatham, Benjamin F.	Brigadier general rank, nom: July 9, 1861 conf: August 28, 1861; Major general rank: March 10, 1862 nom: March 11, 1862 conf: March 13, 1862	Mexican–American War: colonel, 3rd Tennessee Infantry.; Major general, Tennessee militia.; Wounded at Shiloh, Ezra Church.; Hood charged he allowed Union troops to escape from Spring Hill, Tennessee, in November 1864.; Historians such as Ezra J. Warner side with Cheatham.
	Chesnut, James Jr.	Brigadier general rank, nom: April 23, 1864 conf: June 9, 1864	Husband of diarist Mary Boykin Chesnut.; South Carolina legislator.; U.S. Senator from South Carolina, December 3, 1858–November 10, 1860.; Provisional Confederate Congress delegate, February 1861.; Colonel, aide to Beauregard at Fort Sumter.; Staff of Jefferson Davis.; Commanded Reserve Forces of South Carolina, April 30, 1864–May 10, 1865.
	Chilton, Robert H.	Brigadier general (special) rank: December 21, 1863 nom: December 22, 1863 conf: February 16, 1864	USMA, 1837.; Mexican–American War.; Resigned as major and paymaster, U.S. Army, April 29, 1861.; Virginia Provisional Army: colonel, cavalry.; Adjutant and Inspector General Department, C.S.A., lieutenant colonel.; Chief of staff to Robert E. Lee.; Inspector general of Army of Northern Virginia.; First brigadier general nomination rejected by Confederate Senate, April 11, 1863.; Relieved of field duty, April 1864.; Finished war as lieutenant colonel, then colonel, inspection branch, Department of Richmond.
	Churchill, Thomas J.	Brigadier general rank: March 4, 1862 nom: March 5, 1862 conf: March 6, 1862; Major general (temporary) rank: March 17, 1865 nom, conf: March 18, 1865	Mexican–American War: captured, exchanged.; Recruited First Arkansas Mounted Rifles, colonel, June 9, 1861.; Surrendered at Arkansas Post, January 11, 1863.; Exchanged April 1863.; May 13, 1864, promotion to major general by E. Kirby Smith rescinded by Jefferson Davis.
	Clanton, James H.	Brigadier general rank: November 16, 1863 nom: November 18, 1863 conf: February 17, 1864	Mexican–American War private.; Alabama legislator.; CSA Alabama Cavalry: captain, November 12, 1861.; 1st Alabama Cavalry: colonel, December 3, 1861.; Resigned 1862.; Aide to John G. Shorter, Braxton Bragg, Leonidas Polk.; Cavalry brigade commander from June 1864.; Badly wounded, captured, Bluff Spring, Florida, March 1865.
	Clark, Charles	Brigadier general rank, nom: May 22, 1861 conf: August 28, 1861	Mississippi legislator, 1838–1844.; Mexican–American War: volunteer colonel from Mississippi.; Severely wounded at Shiloh, Baton Rouge, 1862.; Captured; exchanged February 1863.; Resigned October 31, 1863.; Governor of Mississippi, November 16, 1863–May 22, 1865.
	Clark, John Bullock Jr.	Brigadier general rank: March 8, 1864 nom: March 12, 1864 conf: May 11, 1864	6th Missouri Infantry, Missouri State Guard: lieutenant, captain, major, July 1861, colonel, June 28, 1862.; Wounded at Wilson's Creek.; 9th Missouri Infantry, colonel, November 16, 1862.; Wounded at Jenkins' Ferry.
	Clayton, Henry DeLamar	Brigadier general rank: April 22, 1863 nom: April 23, 1863 conf: April 25, 1863; Major general (temporary) rank, nom: July 7, 1864 conf: February 20, 1865	Two-term Alabama legislator.; 1st Alabama Infantry: colonel, March 28, 1861.; Resigned January 1862.; Recruited 39th Alabama Infantry: colonel, May 15, 1862.; Severely wounded at Stones River.; Wounded at Chickamauga.; Led rear guard in retreat from Nashville.
	Cleburne, Patrick R.	Brigadier general rank: March 4, 1862 nom: March 5, 1862 conf: March 6, 1865; Major general rank: December 13, 1862 nom: December 20, 1862 conf: April 22, 1863	Born March 17, 1828, County Cork, Ireland; Three years in British Army.; 1st Arkansas Militia, colonel, May 14, 1861.; 1st Arkansas Infantry: colonel, July 23, 1861.; 15th Arkansas Infantry: colonel, October 15, 1861.; Proposed abolition of slavery, arming slaves to fight for Confederacy in January 1864.; Wounded at Richmond, Kentucky; Perryville.; Killed leading division at Franklin, November 30, 1864.
	Clingman, Thomas Lanier	Brigadier general rank: May 17, 1862 nom: September 17, 1862 conf: September 30, 1862	North Carolina legislator, 1835.; U.S. Representatives, March 4, 1843–March 3, 1845, March 4, 1847–March 7, 1858.; U.S. Senator, May 7, 1858–withdrew March 28, 1861.; Refused to resign U.S. Senate seat, expelled.; 25th North Carolina Infantry: colonel, August 13, 1861.; Wounded at New Bern, North Carolina.; Badly wounded in battle along Weldon Railroad, August 1864.
	Cobb, Howell	Brigadier general rank, nom. conf: February 12, 1862; Major general rank: September 9, 1862 nom: September 19, 1863 conf: January 25, 1864	U.S. Treasury Secretary under President James Buchanan.; 16th Georgia Infantry: colonel, July 15, 1861.; Suggested a prisoner-of-war camp in southern Georgia, led to establishment of Andersonville.; Vehemently opposed Robert E. Lee's proposal to enlist slaves into army.; After receiving a presidential pardon in 1868, publicly denounced Reconstruction.; Brother of Thomas Reade Rootes Cobb.
	Cobb, Thomas Reade Rootes		See incomplete appointments section in List of American Civil War generals (Acting Confederate). Warner lists as a general; Eicher does not.
	Cocke, Philip St. George	Brigadier general rank, nom: October 21, 1861 conf: December 13, 1861	USMA, 1832.; Resigned as 2nd lieutenant and adjutant, U.S. Army, April 1, 1834.; After John Brown's Harpers Ferry raid, organized militia in home county.; Provisional Army of Virginia: brigadier general, April 21, 1861.; 19th Virginia Infantry, colonel, April 27, 1861.; Led troops at Blackburn's Ford, First Bull Run.; Returned home after 8 months in ill health.; Suicide, December 26, 1861.
	Cockrell, Francis M.	Brigadier general rank: July 18, 1863 nom: July 23, 1863 conf: February 17, 1864	Missouri State Guard, captain, brigadier general.; 1st Missouri Infantry: private, captain, January 15, 1862.; 2d Missouri Infantry, lieutenant colonel, March 1862, colonel, March 14, 1862.; Wounded in Vicksburg, Atlanta campaigns.; Severely wounded at Franklin.; Captured at Fort Blakely (Mobile).
	Colquitt, Alfred Holt	Brigadier general rank: September 1, 1862 nom: September 15, 1862 conf: September 30, 1862	Mexican–American War: staff major.; U.S. Representative, March 4, 1853–March 3, 1855.; Georgia legislator, 1859.; 6th Georgia Infantry, colonel, May 1861.; In command at Battle of Olustee, Florida.
	Colston, Raleigh E. "Parlez"	Brigadier general nom: December 23, 1861 rank, conf: December 24, 1861	Born October 21, 1825, Paris, France.; VMI, 1846.; 16th Virginia Infantry, colonel, May 2, 1861.
	Conner, James	Brigadier general (special) nom: May 30, 1864 rank, conf: June 1, 1864	U.S. District Attorney, 1856.; Prosecuted case of slave ship Echo.; Hampton's Legion, captain, May 1861, major, July 21, 1861.; 22nd North Carolina Infantry, colonel, June 13, 1862.; Wounded, fractured leg at Gaines Mill.; Lost leg at Cedar Creek, Virginia skirmish, October 13, 1864.
	Cook, Philip	Brigadier general rank: August 5, 1864 nom: August 8, 1864 conf: February 3, 1865	Seminole War, 1836.; Georgia state senator.; 4th Georgia Infantry, private, April 1861, Sergeant, May 1861, 1st lieutenant, assistant adjutant general, October 2, 1861, lieutenant colonel, August 1862, colonel, November 1, 1862.; Wounded three times, the last at Fort Stedman on March 25, 1865.; Captured while in hospital, Petersburg, Virginia, April 2, 1865.
	Cooke, John Rogers	Brigadier general rank, nom: November 1, 1862 conf: April 22, 1863	U.S. Army commission after college.; Son of Union brigadier general (brevet major general), Philip St. George Cooke.; Resigned as 1st lieutenant, U.S. Army, May 30, 1861.; Assistant quartermaster, Army of the Potomac, 1861.; Artillery, Aquia District, Virginia, 1861–1862.; 27th North Carolina Infantry, colonel, April 1862.; Wounded 7 times, skull fracture at Fredericksburg.
	Cooper, Douglas H.	Brigadier general rank: May 2, 1863 nom: June 23, 1863 conf: February 17, 1864	Mexican–American War.; U.S. agent to Choctaw Nation, 1853.; 1st Choctaw and Chickasaw Mounted Rifles, colonel, November 1861.; Mainly stationed in Indian Territory.; Superintendent of Indian Affairs.; Commanded Indian brigade in Sterling Price's Missouri campaign, 1864.
	Cooper, Samuel	Brigadier general rank, nom, conf: March 16, 1861; General (ACSA) rank: May 16, 1861 nom, conf: August 31, 1861	Born June 12, 1798, Dutchess County, New York.; USMA, 1815.; Colonel and adjutant general, U.S. Army, 1852.; Married a sister of U.S. Senator James Murray Mason of Virginia. Resigned as colonel, U.S. Army, March 7, 1861.; Ranking general officer of the Confederate Army, May 16, 1861.; Adjutant and inspector general throughout the war.; Never in field command but contributed valuable organizational skills.
	Corse, Montgomery Dent	Brigadier general rank, nom: November 1, 1862 conf: April 22, 1863	Mexican–American War: captain, 1st Virginia Volunteers.; Virginia militia: major, April 10, 1861.; 17th Virginia Infantry: colonel, June 10, 1861.; Wounded three times.; Captured at Sailor's Creek.
	Cosby, George B.	Brigadier general rank: January 20, 1863 nom: January 23, 1863 conf: April 23, 1863	USMA, 1852.; Resigned as captain, U.S. Army, May 10, 1861.; Major, assistant adjutant general, June 20, 1861.; Staff major for Buckner at Fort Donelson; Captured.; Exchanged August 15, 1862.
	Cox, William Ruffin	Brigadier general (temporary) rank: May 31, 1864 nom, conf: June 2, 1864	2nd North Carolina Infantry: major, June 19, 1861, lieutenant colonel, September 17, 1862, colonel, March 20, 1863.; Wounded eleven times.; Died December 26, 1919, Richmond, Virginia, one of the last surviving Confederate generals.
	Crittenden, George Bibb	Brigadier general nom: August 13, 1861 rank: August 15, 1861 conf: August 16, 1861; Major general rank, nom: November 9, 1861 conf: December 13, 1861 re-conf: February 17, 1862	Brother of Union Major General Thomas L. Crittenden.; Black Hawk War.; Texas Army.; Captured in Mier Expedition, exchanged.; U.S. Army Mounted Rifles, captain, May 27, 1846.; Mexican–American War.; Cashiered August 19, 1848, restored March 15, 1849.; Resigned as lieutenant colonel, U.S. Army, June 10, 1861.; Resigned as major general after badly defeated at Fishing Creek (Mill Springs).; Hardee ordered him arrested for drunkenness, April 1, 1862, restored, April 18, 1862.; Court of inquiry ordered by Braxton Bragg, July 24, 1862.; Resigned as major general, reverted to colonel, October 23, 1862.
	Cumming, Alfred	Brigadier general rank, nom: October 29, 1862 conf: April 22, 1863	USMA, 1849.; Utah War; Mormon Expedition.; Resigned as captain, U.S. Army, January 19, 1861.; 1st Georgia Infantry: major, May 1861.; 10th Georgia Infantry: lieutenant colonel, June 17, 1861, colonel, September 25, 1861.; Wounded at Malvern Hill, Antietam.; Captured at Vicksburg, July 4, 1863.; Exchanged October 13, 1863.; Disabled by wounds at Jonesboro, August 31, 1864.

== D ==
Image	Name	Rank	Notes
	Daniel, Junius	Brigadier general rank: September 1, 1862 nom: September 15, 1862 conf: September 30, 1862	USMA, 1851.; Resigned as 1st lieutenant, U.S. Army, January 14, 1858.; 14th North Carolina Infantry, colonel, June 3, 1861.; 45th North Carolina Infantry, colonel, April 14, 1862.; Wounded at Malvern Hill.; Mortally wounded at "Bloody Angle" at Spotsylvania, May 12, 1864, died the next day.
	Davidson, Henry B.	Brigadier general rank, nom: August 18, 1863 conf: February 17, 1864	USMA, 1853.; Mexican–American War, enlisted at 15.; Served on frontier with U.S. Army.; Dropped as captain, U.S. Army, as AWOL, July 30, 1861.; Confederate staff officer, major, April 1861, colonel, June 1862.; Captured at Island Number 10, April 4, 1862, exchanged August 15, 1862.
	Davis, Joseph R.	Brigadier general rank: September 15, 1862 nom: September 26, 1862 conf: October 8, 1862	Nephew of Jefferson Davis.; Mississippi legislator.; 10th Mississippi Infantry: lieutenant colonel, April 12, 1861.; Jefferson Davis staff as colonel, August 31, 1861.; Wounded at Gettysburg.
	Davis, William G.M.	Brigadier general rank, nom: November 4, 1862 conf: April 22, 1863	1st Florida Cavalry: raised, equipped, lieutenant colonel, November 4, 1861, colonel, January 1, 1862.; Served in East Tennessee.; Resigned May 6, 1863.; Operated and managed blockade runners thereafter.
	Dearing, James		See incomplete appointments section in List of American Civil War generals (Acting Confederate).: Warner lists as general; Eicher does not.; Despite lack of Senate confirmation often identified as last Confederate general to die of wounds from battle.
	Deas, Zachariah Cantey	Brigadier general rank: December 13, 1862 nom: December 20, 1862 conf: April 22, 1863	Mexican–American War.; Aide to Joseph E. Johnston, July 1861.; 22nd Alabama Infantry, colonel, October 25, 1861.; Badly wounded, in temporary brigade command at Shiloh.; Wounded at Franklin.
	De Lagnel, Julius A.	Lt. colonel Brigadier general rank: April 15, 1862 nom: April 16, 1862 conf: April 18, 1862 declined July 31, 1862	U.S. Army officer, 1847–1861.; Resigned as 1st lieutenant, U.S. Army, May 17, 1861.; Captain of Artillery, Army of the Northwest, June 1861.; Wounded defending Rich Mountain, June 11, 1861.; Captured at Laurel Hill, July 13, 1861, exchanged December 18, 1861, for James B. Ricketts.; Appointed brigadier general to rank from April 12, 1862. Confirmed but declined commission, July 31, 1862.; Eicher, Warner nonetheless list as a general.; Briefly served as artillery major in Army of Northern Virginia.; Served in ordnance bureau in Richmond and Fayetteville, North Carolina as lieutenant colonel.
	Deshler, James		See incomplete appointments section in List of American Civil War generals (Acting Confederate). Warner lists as a general; Eicher does not.
	Dibrell, George Gibbs	Brigadier general rank: July 26, 1864 nom: January 24, 1865 conf: January 28, 1865	Tennessee legislator.; Tennessee militia, private, June 1861.; 25th Tennessee Infantry, lieutenant colonel, August 10, 1861.; 8th Tennessee Cavalry (13th Tennessee Cavalry), colonel, September 1862.; Cavalry brigade commander under Nathan Bedford Forrest, Joseph Wheeler.; Run over by horse and incapacitated, May 1863.; Appointed brigadier general for new units.; Wounded twice.
	Dockery, Thomas P.	Brigadier general rank: August 10, 1863; 2d nom: June 1, 1864 conf: June 10, 1864	5th Arkansas Militia, colonel, June 1861.; 19th Arkansas Infantry: colonel, May 12, 1862.; Commanded 2nd brigade under John S. Bowen at Vicksburg.; Captured, paroled, exchanged.; Brigade command at Marks' Mills, Jenkins' Ferry.
	Doles, George Pierce	Brigadier general rank, nom: November 1, 1862 conf: April 22, 1863	Georgia militia captain.; 4th Georgia Infantry: captain, May 9, 1861, colonel, May 26, 1862.; Stationed near Norfolk, Virginia, first year of war.; Wounded at Malvern Hill.; Killed at Totopotomoy Creek, also known as Bethesda Church, June 2, 1864, aged 34.
	Donelson, Daniel Smith	Brigadier general rank, nom: July 9, 1861 conf: August 28, 1861; Major general (posthumous) rank: January 17, 1863 nom: March 5, 1863 conf: April 22, 1863	USMA, 1825.; Nephew of Andrew Jackson.; Brother of Jackson's private secretary, Andrew Jackson Donelson, who adhered to the Union.; Resigned as 2nd lieutenant, U.S. Army, 1826.; Speaker of Tennessee House of Representatives.; Tennessee Militia brigadier general.; Died from chronic diarrhea at Montvale Springs, Tennessee, April 17, 1863, before major general promotion was confirmed; Senate was without knowledge Donelson died.
	Drayton, Thomas F.	Brigadier general rank, nom: September 25, 1861 conf: December 13, 1861	USMA, 1828.; Brother of Union Navy Captain Percival Drayton.; Resigned as 2nd lieutenant, U.S. Army, August 15, 1836.; South Carolina legislator.; In command at unsuccessful Battle of Port Royal.; Much criticized by superiors.; Minor departmental command and boards of inquiry in the Trans–Mississippi Department after November 26, 1862.
	Du Bose, Dudley M.	Brigadier general (temporary) rank: November 16, 1864 nom: November 30, 1864 conf: December 5, 1864	Lieutenant, aide to Robert Toombs, July 1861.; 15th Georgia Infantry: colonel, January 1863.; Wounded at Chickamauga.; Captured at Sailor's Creek, April 6, 1865.
	Duke, Basil W.	Brigadier general rank: September 15, 1864 nom: September 19, 1864 conf: January 17, 1865	Supported secession of Missouri.; Brother-in-law of John Hunt Morgan.; 2nd Kentucky Cavalry: private, soon 2nd lieutenant, then 1st lieutenant, November 1861.; Wounded at Shiloh.; Lt. colonel, August 1862, colonel, December 7, 1862.; Brigade command under Morgan, April 1863.; Captured during Morgan's Ohio raid; prisoner at Buffington Island, Ohio for more than year, exchanged August 1864.; Escort to Jefferson Davis and Confederate government at end of war.; Died September 16, 1916, New York City, aged 78.
	Duncan, Johnson K.	Brigadier general rank, conf: January 7, 1862 nom: January 9, 1862	USMA, 1849.; Seminole Wars.; Resigned as 1st lieutenant, U.S. Army, January 31, 1855.; 1st Louisiana Heavy Artillery: major, colonel, 1861.; Captured April 28, 1862, at Fort Jackson, Louisiana.; Exchanged August 15, 1862.; Chief of staff to Braxton Bragg.; Died of typhoid fever, December 18, 1862, Knoxville Tennessee.
	Dunovant, John		See incomplete appointments section in List of American Civil War generals (Acting Confederate). Warner lists as a general; Eicher does not.

== E ==
Image	Name	Rank	Notes
	Early, Jubal Anderson "Jube" "Jubilee"	Brigadier general rank, nom: July 21, 1861 conf: August 28, 1861; Major general rank: January 17, 1863 nom: January 23, 1863 conf: April 23, 1863; Lieutenant general (temporary) rank, nom, conf: May 31, 1864	USMA, 1837.; Seminole War.; Mexican–American War.; Voted against secession in Virginia convention.; Brigadier general of Virginia militia, April 10, 1861.; 24th Virginia Infantry, colonel, May 21, 1861.; Wounded at Williamsburg.; Led a Confederate army in the Valley Campaigns of 1864, including the battles of Monocacy, Fort Stevens and Cedar Creek.; Command dispersed at Waynesboro.
	Echols, John	Brigadier general rank, nom: April 16, 1862 conf: April 18, 1862	Virginia legislator.; 27th Virginia Infantry: lieutenant colonel, May 30, 1861, colonel, October 14, 1861.; Severely wounded at the First Battle of Kernstown, March 23, 1862.
	Ector, Mathew D.	Brigadier general rank: August 23, 1862 nom: September 15, 1862 conf: September 27, 1862	Georgia state legislator.; Moved to Texas.; Mexican–American War.; Texas legislator, 1855.; Texas Cavalry: private, lieutenant colonel, May 1861.; J. L. Hogg's brigade, adjutant, May 1862.; 14th Texas Cavalry (dismounted), colonel, July 1862.; Wounded at Chickamauga.; Lost leg at New Hope Church.
	Elliott, Stephen Jr.	Brigadier general (special) rank, nom: May 24, 1864 conf: May 28, 1864	11th South Carolina Infantry, captain, June 12, 1861.; Wounded at Fort Beauregard, November 7, 1861.; Head wound, Fort Sumter, December 11, 1863.; Holcombe's Legion, colonel, April 20, 1864.; Badly wounded deploying troops at the Crater.; Badly wounded at Bentonville.; Elected to South Carolina State legislature in 1866 but died before serving, February 21, 1866, aged 35.
	Elzey, Arnold	Brigadier general rank, nom: July 21, 1861 conf: August 28, 1861; Major general rank, nom: December 4, 1862 conf: April 22, 1863	USMA, 1837.; Dropped last name of Jones.; Seminole Wars.; Mexican–American War.; Resigned as captain, 2nd Artillery, U.S. Army, April 25, 1861. 1st Maryland Infantry: colonel, June 17, 1861.; Wounded at Cross Keys.; Severely wounded at Gaines Mill.; Commanded Department of Richmond.; Organized Local Defense Brigade.; Transferred to Artillery, Army of Tennessee, September 8, 1864.
	Evans, Clement A.	Brigadier general rank, nom: May 19, 1864 conf: May 20, 1864	Georgia State senator in 1859.; 31st Georgia Infantry: private, 1861, major, November 18, 1861, colonel, May 13, 1862.; With Army of Northern Virginia from the Peninsula campaign until Appomattox.; With Jubal Early in Valley Campaigns of 1865.; Wounded five times.; Retired as minister, 1892, wrote 12-volume Confederate Military History, other works.
	Evans, Nathan G. "Shanks"	Brigadier general rank, nom: October 1, 1861 conf: December 19, 1861	USMA, 1848.; Resigned as captain, U.S. Army, February 27, 1861; Major and assistant adjutant general, South Carolina militia, January 1861.; Assistant adjutant general, James Island Forces, April 1861–July 20, 1861.; 4th South Carolina Infantry, colonel, July 1861.; Detected McDowell's turning movement at First Bull Run.; Commanded at Ball's Bluff.; From early 1863 was in difficulty, not in command due to apparent intoxication, presumed incompetence.; Fell from horse, April 16, 1864.; Reconfirmed June 10, 1864.
	Ewell, Richard Stoddert "Baldy"	Brigadier general rank, nom: June 17, 1861 conf: August 28, 1861; Major general rank, conf: January 24, 1862 nom: January 17, 1862; Lieutenant general rank, nom: May 23, 1863 conf: February 2, 1864	USMA, 1837.; Mexican–American War.; Wounded by Apaches, 1859.; Resigned as captain, U.S. Army, May 7, 1861.; Virginia Provisional Army, colonel of cavalry, May 9, 1861.; First field officer wounded: at Battle of Fairfax Court House (June 1861).; Lt. general to succeed Stonewall Jackson, commander, 2nd Corps, Army of Northern Virginia.; Lost leg at Second Manassas (Groveton).; Commanded corps from Gettysburg to Spotsylvania.; Hesitated to attack Culp's Hill and Cemetery Hill on first day at Gettysburg.; In charge of defenses of Richmond, Virginia.; Wounded eight times.; Captured at Sailor's Creek.

== F ==
Image	Name	Rank	Notes
	Fagan, James F.	Brigadier general rank: September 12, 1862 nom; September 26, 1862 conf: October 3, 1862; Major general (temporary); April 25, 1864 nom: June 11, 1864 conf: June 13, 1864	Mexican–American War.; One–term Arkansas legislator.; 1st Arkansas Infantry: colonel, May 6, 1861.; 6th Arkansas Cavalry, colonel, July 11, 1862.; Fought at Prairie Grove, against Camden Expedition, during Price's 1864 Missouri Raid.
	Featherston, Winfield Scott "Swet"	Brigadier general rank: March 4, 1862 nom: March 5, 1862 conf: March 6, 1862	Creek War, 1837.; U.S. Representative from Mississippi, March 4, 1847–March 3, 1851. CSA Infantry: captain, May 21, 1861.; 17th Mississippi Infantry: colonel, June 4, 1861.; Wounded at Frayser's Farm.; Transferred to Vicksburg, became separated from main army and avoided capture.
	Ferguson, Samuel W.	Brigadier general rank: July 23, 1863 nom: July 28, 1863 conf: February 14, 1864	USMA, 1857.; Utah War (Mormon Expedition).; Resigned as 2nd lieutenant, U.S. Army, March 1, 1861.; Served on Beauregard's staff from March 1861 until after Shiloh.; 28th Mississippi Cavalry, lieutenant colonel, February 24, 1862.; 5th South Carolina Infantry: colonel, May 7, 1863.; Cavalry duty in Vicksburg campaign.
	Field, Charles W.	Brigadier general rank: March 9, 1862 nom: March 11, 1862 conf: March 13, 1862; Major general nom: February 6, 1864 rank, conf: February 12, 1864	USMA, 1849.; Resigned as captain, U.S. Army, May 30, 1861.; 6th Virginia Cavalry: major, June 1861, lieutenant colonel, July 1861, Colonel, August 1861.; Brigadier general appointment reconfirmed March 18, 1862, transferred to infantry.; Badly wounded at Second Bull Run.; Superintendent of Bureau of Conscription until recovery.; Led Hood's old division for remaining campaigns of Army of Northern Virginia.; Wounded at the Wilderness.
	Finegan, Joseph	Brigadier general rank, nom, conf: April 5, 1862	Born Clones, Ireland.; In early 20s, emigrated to Florida, 1834.; 1st Florida Battalion: lieutenant colonel, January 14, 1862.; In charge of military affairs of State of Florida.; Nominal command at Battle of Olustee.; Transferred with brigade of Florida regiments to Virginia, May, 1864.; Fought at Cold Harbor, Petersburg.; Returned to duty in Florida, March 20, 1865.
	Finley, Jesse Johnson	Brigadier general rank: November 16, 1863 nom: November 18, 1863 conf: February 17, 1864	Seminole War, captain, 1836.; Served in legislatures of Arkansas and Florida.; Mayor of Memphis, Tennessee.; Judge in Florida, 1852.; Resigned as Confederate district judge to enlist as private, March 1862, captain, March 1862.; 6th Florida Infantry: colonel, April 14, 1862.; Wounded at Resaca, Georgia.; Severely wounded at Jonesboro, incapacitated for field duty.
	Floyd, John Buchanan	Brigadier general rank, nom: May 23, 1861; August 28, 1861	Virginia legislator, 1847.; Governor of Virginia, January 1, 1848–January 16, 1852.; Secretary of war under President James Buchanan until December 29, 1860.; Indicted by D.C. Grand Jury for conspiracy and treason, January 27, 1861.; Provisional Army of Virginia, major general.; Transferred command of Fort Donelson to Gideon J. Pillow, escaped with his troops.; Removed from command by Jefferson Davis, March 11, 1862.; Virginia militia, major general, May 17, 1862–August 26, 1863, when died at Abingdon, Virginia.
	Forney, John H.	Brigadier general rank March 10, 1862 nom: March 11, 1862 conf: March 13, 1862 re-conf: March 18, 1862; Major general rank, nom: October 27, 1862 conf: April 22, 1863	USMA, 1852.; Younger brother of William Henry Forney.; Resigned as 1st lieutenant, U.S. Army, January 23, 1861.; Colonel, CSA and inspector general of forces near Pensacola, March 7, 1861–June 4, 1861.; 10th Alabama Infantry: colonel, June 4, 1861.; Wounded at Dranesville, December 20, 1861.; Division command at Vicksburg; captured, exchanged October 13, 1863.; In Trans–Mississippi Department in command of John G. Walker's former division.
	Forney, William Henry	Brigadier general rank: February 15, 1865 nom: February 22, 1865 conf: February 23, 1865	Older brother of John H. Forney.; Mexican–American War.; Alabama legislator, 1859.; 10th Alabama Infantry: captain, June 4, 1861.; Wounded at Dranesville; 4 times in total.; Wounded, left on field at Gettysburg, captured.; Prisoner for over a year.; Exchanged August 3, 1864.
	Forrest, Nathan Bedford	Brigadier general rank, nom: July 21, 1862 conf: September 30, 1862; Major general rank, nom: December 4, 1863 conf: January 25, 1864; Lieutenant general rank: February 28, 1865 nom, conf: March 2, 1865	Stockman, blacksmith, planter, slave trader.; 7th Tennessee Cavalry: private, June 14, 1861.; Forrest's Cavalry Battalion, lieutenant colonel, October 1861.; 3rd Tennessee Cavalry: colonel, January 3, 1862.; Led his troops out of Fort Donelson, with permission, before surrender.; Brigade command, Army of Tennessee, at Shiloh.; Captured Union garrison, supplies at Murfreesboro, Tennessee.; Independent command in North Mississippi and West Tennessee; captured Fort Pillow, but did not prevent massacre of black Union soldiers after their surrender.; Routed superior force at Brice's Crossroads, June 1864; later at Tupelo.; Overwhelmed at Selma, Alabama, surrendered, April 1865.; Wounded 9 times.
	Frazer, John W.		See incomplete appointments section in List of American Civil War generals (Acting Confederate). Warner lists as a general; Eicher does not.
	French, Samuel Gibbs	Brigadier general rank, nom: October 23, 1861 conf: December 13, 1861; Major general rank: August 31, 1862 nom: October 22, 1862 conf: April 22, 1863	USMA, 1843.; Mexican–American War; wounded.; Resigned as captain and assistant quartermaster, U.S. Army, May 13, 1856.; Colonel, ordnance, Mississippi Militia, February 12, 1861.; Relieved before Nashville due to eye infection, temporary near blindness.; Served and surrendered at Mobile.; Died April 20, 1910, aged 91.
	Frost, Daniel M.	Brigadier general rank: March 3, 1862 nom: March 5, 1862 conf: March 10, 1862	USMA, 1844.; Mexican–American War.; Wounded in head, damaged eyesight, 1852.; Resigned as 1st lieutenant, U.S. Army, May 31, 1853.; Missouri Senator.; Missouri militia brigadier general.; Surrendered Camp Jackson at St. Louis to Nathaniel Lyon, May 10, 1861.; Captured, exchanged for James A. Mulligan, November 1, 1861.; Left army without resigning, went to Mexico, Cuba and Canada when wife banished from home near St. Louis.; Dropped from army rolls, December 9, 1863.; Returned to Missouri, 1865.
	Fry, Birkett Davenport	Brigadier general (special) nom: May 14, 1864 rank, conf: May 24, 1864	Attended VMI; USMA.; Dropped out of college to study law.; Mexican–American War.; With filibuster William Walker in Nicaragua.; 13th Alabama Infantry: colonel, July 19, 1861.; Severely wounded at Seven Pines, Antietam and Chancellorsville.; Commanded Archer's brigade at Gettysburg.; Wounded in Pickett's Charge, captured and exchanged April 5, 1864.; Wounded 4 times.

== G ==
Image	Name	Rank	Notes
	Gano, Richard Montgomery	Brigadier general rank: March 17, 1865 nom, conf: March 18, 1865	Military service against Indians.; Doctor; Texas legislator.; Gano's Texas Cavalry, captain, March 1862; Major, July 4, 1862.; 7th Kentucky Cavalry, colonel, September 1, 1862.; Transferred to Indian Territory.; Wounded in Camden campaign.
	Gardner, Franklin	Brigadier general April 11, 1862 nom: April 12, 1862 conf: April 19, 1862; Major general rank: December 13, 1862 nom: December 20, 1862 re-nom: June 6, 1864 conf: June 10, 1864	Born in New York City.; USMA, 1843.; Mexican–American War.; Wife was from Louisiana.; Dropped as captain, U.S. Army, for abandoning post, May 7, 1861.; CSA captain, assistant adjutant general, September 11, 1861.; Major general to rank from December 13, 1862, not confirmed until June 10, 1864.; In command and surrendered Port Hudson, Louisiana; captured.; Exchanged in August 1864.; Brother and father (retired veteran and U.S. Treasury clerk until 1867) adhered to the Union.
	Gardner, William M.	Brigadier general rank, nom: November 14, 1861 conf: December 13, 1861 re-conf: June 10, 1864	USMA, 1846.; Mexican–American War; wounded.; Resigned as captain, U.S. Army, January 19, 1861.; 8th Georgia Infantry: lieutenant colonel, May 1861, colonel, July 21, 1861.; Leg shattered by a ball at First Bull Run.; Commanded District of Middle Florida, participated in Battle of Olustee; Command of military prisons east of the Mississippi in 1864.; Commandant of post at Richmond, Virginia at end of the war.
	Garland, Samuel Jr.	Brigadier general rank: May 23, 1862 nom: September 23, 1862 conf: September 30, 1862 (posthumous)	VMI, 1849.; 11th Virginia Infantry: captain, April 24, 1861, colonel, July 1861.; Wounded at Williamsburg.; Killed September 14, 1862, at Fox's Gap, South Mountain, Maryland, aged 31.; Posthumous confirmation as brigadier general.; Eicher, Warner nonetheless list as a general.
	Garnett, Richard B.	Brigadier general rank, nom: November 14, 1861 conf: December 13, 1861	USMA, 1841.; Seminole Wars.; No active service in Mexican–American War.; Resigned as captain, U.S. Army, May 17, 1861.; Major, ACSA Artillery, May 1861.; Georgia Legion, lieutenant colonel, August 31, 1861.; Arrested, probably unfairly, by Stonewall Jackson for neglect of duty; court martial never concluded.; Killed at Gettysburg, July 3, 1863, in Pickett's Charge, aged 45.; Cousin of Robert S. Garnett. {Note Robert Garnett's picture has often been mistakenly listed as that of "Richard Garnett"; likewise a Library of Congress picture labeled as Franklin Gardner is believed to be Richard B Garnett}
	Garnett, Robert S.	Brigadier general rank, nom: June 6, 1861 conf: August 28, 1861 (posthumous)	USMA, 1841.; Mexican–American War.; Commandant of cadets at West Point, November 1, 1852–July 31, 1854.; Resigned as major, U.S. Army, April 30, 1861.; Colonel, Virginia Provisional Army.; In command in northwestern Virginia, June 8, 1861.; Retreated after Rich Mountain, Laurel Hill.; Killed at Corrick's Ford, (West) Virginia, on the Cheat River, July 13, 1861.; Posthumous confirmation.; Eicher, Warner list as a general.; Often shown as first general killed in Civil War, before First Bull Run.; Cousin of Richard B. Garnett.
	Garrott, Isham Warren		See incomplete appointments section in List of American Civil War generals (Acting Confederate).: Warner lists as a general; Eicher does not.
	Gartrell, Lucius Jeremiah	Brigadier general rank: August 22, 1864 nom: August 23, 1864 conf: January 17, 1865	Georgia legislator.; U.S. Representative from Georgia, March 4, 1857–withdrew January 23, 1861.; 7th Georgia Infantry: colonel, May 31, 1861.; Confederate Congressman, February 18, 1862–February 17, 1864.; Opposed Sherman in South Carolina with Georgia reserves regiments.; Wounded at Coosawhatchie.
	Gary, Martin Witherspoon "Bald Eagle", "Mart"	Brigadier general rank: May 19, 1864 nom: June 13, 1864 conf: June 14, 1864	South Carolina legislator.; Hampton's Legion: captain, June 12, 1861, lieutenant colonel, June 16, 1862, colonel, August 25, 1862.; Escaped from Appomattox Court House and helped escort Jefferson Davis and cabinet south.; Last meeting of cabinet at his mother's home in Cokesbury, South Carolina.
	Gatlin, Richard C.	Brigadier general rank: July 8, 1861 nom: August 13, 1861 conf: August 16, 1861	USMA, 1832.; Mexican–American War, wounded.; Resigned as major, U.S. Army, May 29, 1861.; Criticized for loss of Fort Hatteras, New Bern.; Relieved of command March 19, 1862.; Resigned Confederate commission September 8, 1862.; Major general and adjutant general of North Carolina militia, September 1862–April 26, 1865.
	Gholson, Samuel J.	Brigadier general rank: May 6, 1864 nom: May 25, 1864 conf: June 1, 1864	Mississippi legislator 3 times.; U.S. Representative from Mississippi, part of two terms.; U.S. District Judge, 1839–1861.; 14th Mississippi Infantry: private, January 1861, Captain May 1861, colonel, October 1861.; Wounded, captured at Fort Donelson.; Exchanged August 15, 1862.; Wounded at Second Corinth.; Wounded at Jackson, Mississippi, June 6, 1864.; Lost arm and captured at Egypt, Mississippi, December 28, 1864.
	Gibson, Randall Lee	Brigadier general (special) rank: January 11, 1864 nom: January 28, 1864 conf: February 1, 1864	U.S. attache, Madrid, Spain.; Aide to Louisiana Governor Moore.; 1st Louisiana Artillery, captain, May 8, 1861.; 13th and 20th Louisiana Infantry: colonel, November 30, 1862.; Captured at Cuba Station, Alabama, May 8, 1865.
	Gilmer, Jeremy Francis	Major general (temporary) rank: August 25, 1863 special law: confirmation not required	USMA, 1839. • Resigned as captain, U.S. Army, June 29, 1861.; CSA lieutenant colonel of engineers. • Engineer, Department No. 2, September 30, 1861.; Captured at Fort Henry but escaped the same day.; Chief engineer for Albert Sidney Johnston. • Wounded at Shiloh.; Promoted to Regular Army (ACSA) colonel of engineers, October 4, 1862.; Chief engineer of Department of Northern Virginia. • Chief of the Engineer Bureau for the Confederacy.; Laid out defenses of Charleston, South Carolina and Atlanta, Georgia.; Wright, Warner, Sifakis list as a temporary major general; Eicher says not confirmed so not a general. Wright cites Act of Confederate Congress of May 21, 1861, allowing Confederate president to appoint temporary generals without Senate confirmation.
	Girardey, Victor J. B.		See incomplete appointments section in List of American Civil War generals (Acting Confederate).: Eicher says not confirmed.; Warner lists as a general, says received commission August 3, 1864.; Killed in action at the Second Battle of Deep Bottom, August 16, 1864.
	Gist, States Rights	Brigadier general nom: March 19, 1862 rank, conf: May 20, 1862	Brigadier general of state militia, 1859.; Colonel and aide to Barnard Bee at First Bull Run where wounded.; Wounded in hand at Atlanta, July 22, 1864.; Mortally wounded at Franklin, died at field hospital the same day, November 30, 1864.
	Gladden, Adley H.	Brigadier general rank, nom: September 30, 1861 conf: December 13, 1861	Seminole War.; Major, lieutenant colonel of the Palmetto Regiment during the Mexican–American War.; Severely wounded at Battle of Belen Gate.; Lt. colonel of 1st South Carolina regiment but resigned to become secession convention delegate.; 1st Louisiana Infantry Regiment: colonel, February 21, 1861.; Mortally wounded at Shiloh; died 6 days later, April 12, 1862, aged 51.
	Godwin, Archibald C.		See incomplete appointments section in List of American Civil War generals (Acting Confederate).: Warner lists as a general; Eicher says appointment unconfirmed at death.
	Goggin, James M.		See incomplete appointments section in List of American Civil War generals (Acting Confederate).: Warner lists as a general; Eicher does not.
	Gordon, George Washington	Brigadier general (temporary) rank: August 15, 1864 nom: August 16, 1864 conf: February 20, 1865	11th Tennessee Infantry: 1st lieutenant, drillmaster, May 1861, captain, July 1861, lieutenant colonel, May 27, 1862.; Captured at Tazewell, Tennessee, and exchanged in November 1862.; Colonel, December 1862.; Wounded and captured at Stones River.; Exchanged 1863.; Led Vaughn's Brigade at Franklin, November 30, 1864; wounded and captured.; Prisoner until paroled July 24, 1865.
	Gordon, James Byron	Brigadier general rank: September 28, 1863 nom: September 29, 1863 conf: February 17, 1864	North Carolina legislator, 1850.; 1st North Carolina Infantry: 1st lieutenant, April 1861.; 9th North Carolina Cavalry: captain, May 8, 1861, major, May 16, 1861.; 1st North Carolina Cavalry: colonel, July 23, 1863.; Wounded at Auburn, Virginia, October 14, 1863.; Mortally wounded at Meadow Bridge, Virginia, May 12, 1864.; Died May 18, 1864, Richmond, Virginia.
	Gordon, John Brown	Brigadier general rank: May 7, 1863 nom: May 11, 1863 conf: January 25, 1864; Major general rank, nom, conf: May 14, 1864	6th Alabama Infantry: captain, April 15, 1861, major, May 14, 1861, lieutenant colonel, December 26, 1861, colonel, April 28, 1862.; Severely wounded at Antietam.; Earlier brigadier general nomination November 1, 1862, to rank from that date not confirmed.
	Gorgas, Josiah	Brigadier general (special) rank: November 10, 1864 nom: November 15, 1864 conf: November 19, 1864	USMA, 1841.; Born in Pennsylvania; married daughter of ex-governor Gayle of Alabama.; Resigned as captain, U.S. Army, April 3, 1861.; Major, chief of ordnance of Confederate States, 1861–1865.; Kept armies supplied with arms and ammunition.; Ran five blockade runners for ordnance department.
	Govan, Daniel C.	Brigadier general rank: December 29, 1863 nom: January 9, 1864 conf: February 5, 1864	Captain, Arkansas Militia, May 1861.; 2nd Arkansas Infantry: lieutenant colonel, June 5, 1861, colonel, January 28, 1862.; Captured at Jonesboro, September 1, 1864.; Exchanged for George Stoneman, October 2, 1864.; Wounded at Nashville.
	Gracie, Archibald Jr.	Brigadier general rank, nom: November 4, 1862 conf: April 22, 1863	Born in New York City.; USMA, 1854.; Resigned as 2nd lieutenant, U.S. Army, May 3, 1856.; Married Josephine Mayo of Richmond.; Captain of a Mobile militia company.; 3rd Alabama Infantry: captain, April 18, 1861.; 11th Alabama Infantry: major, July 12, 1861.; 43rd Alabama Infantry: colonel, May 15, 1862.; Severely wounded at Bean's Station, Tennessee.; Killed December 2, 1864, at Petersburg, aged 31.; Other family members adhered to the Union.
	Granbury, Hiram B.	Brigadier general (special) rank: February 29, 1864 nom: March 5, 1864 conf: May 11, 1864	Chief justice (chairman of county supervisors) of McLennan County, 1856–1858.; 7th Texas Infantry: captain, May 1861, major, November 1861, colonel, August 29, 1862.; Captured at Fort Donelson, February 16, 1862.; Exchanged August 15, 1862.; Wounded at Chickamauga.; Killed at Franklin, November 30, 1864.
	Gray, Henry	Brigadier general rank: March 17, 1865 nom, conf: March 18, 1865	Mississippi legislator for one term.; Louisiana legislator, 1860.; Enlisted as private.; Organized 28th Louisiana Infantry at request of Jefferson Davis; colonel, May 2, 1862.; Wounded at Bayou Teche.; At times in brigade command.; Original nomination of April 8, 1864, not confirmed.; Elected as Confederate Congressman from Louisiana without his knowledge.; Eicher says: Representative from Louisiana, December 28, 1864–March 17, 1865.
	Grayson, John B.	Brigadier general nom: August 13, 1861 nom: August 15, 1861 conf: August 16, 1861	USMA, 1826.; Seminole Wars.; Mexican–American War.; Resigned as major, U.S. Army, and commissary of subsistence, July 1, 1861.; Brigadier general, North Carolina Militia, 1861.; Assigned to Department of Middle and Eastern Florida.; Died from disease of lungs (tuberculosis, pneumonia), October 21, 1861, Tallahassee, Florida.
	Green, Martin E.	Brigadier general rank, nom: July 23, 1862 conf: September 30, 1862	Organized and elected colonel, July 1861, of Missouri cavalry command under Sterling Price.; Brigadier general, Missouri State Guard, December 2, 1861.; Colonel, CSA, April 1862.; Wounded at Vicksburg, June 25, 1863.; Killed while looking over the parapet at Vicksburg, June 27, 1863.
	Green, Thomas	Brigadier general rank: May 20, 1863 nom: May 23, 1863 conf: January 25, 1864	Fought at San Jacinto.; Mexican–American War.; Clerk of the Texas Supreme Court, 1841–1861.; 5th Texas Cavalry: colonel, August 20, 1861.; Fought at Galveston, January 1863.; Killed by a shell from a Union gunboat, April 12, 1864, Blair's Landing, Louisiana.
	Greer, Elkanah	Brigadier general nom: October 4, 1862 rank, conf: October 8, 1862	Mexican–American War.; 3rd Texas Cavalry: colonel, July 1, 1861.; Wounded at Pea Ridge.; Chief of bureau of conscription in Trans–Mississippi Department, October 8, 1862–May 26, 1865.; Commanded reserve forces of department during 1864 operations and March–May, 1865.
	Gregg, John	Brigadier general rank: August 29, 1862 nom: September 15, 1862 conf: September 27, 1862	Judge.; Member of Texas secession convention.; Resigned from Provisional Confederate Congress in 1861.; 7th Texas Infantry: colonel, September 1861.; Captured at Fort Donelson.; Exchanged August 15, 1862.; Severely wounded at Chickamauga.; Killed at Battle of Darbytown and New Market Roads, October 7, 1864.
	Gregg, Maxcy	Brigadier general rank, nom: December 14, 1861 conf: December 24, 1861	Mexican–American War: major, 12th U.S. Infantry; discharged July 25, 1848.; 1st South Carolina Volunteer Infantry: colonel, January 25, 1861.; 1st South Carolina Infantry: colonel, July 25, 1861.; Wounded at Antietam.; Mortally wounded at Fredericksburg; died December 15, 1862.
	Griffith, Richard	Brigadier general rank, nom: November 2, 1861 conf: December 13, 1861	Born in Philadelphia.; Mexican–American War.; Mississippi State treasurer, 2 terms.; Brigadier general, Mississippi Militia.; 12th Mississippi Infantry: colonel, May 23, 1861.; Brigade command at Seven Days' Battles.; Mortally wounded June 29, 1862, at Savage's Station, died the same day in Richmond.
	Grimes, Bryan	Brigadier general rank: May 19, 1864 nom: May 28, 1864 conf: June 1, 1864; Major general rank: February 15, 1865 nom: February 22, 1865 conf: February 23, 1865	Member of North Carolina secession convention.; 4th North Carolina Infantry: major, May 16, 1861, lieutenant colonel, May 1, 1862, colonel, June 19, 1862.; Wounded 4 times.; Last Army of Northern Virginia major general commissioned, February 15, 1865, confirmed February 23, 1865.

== H ==
Image	Name	Rank	Notes
	Hagood, Johnson	Brigadier general rank, nom: July 21, 1862 conf: September 30, 1862	South Carolina Military Academy, 1847.; South Carolina militia brigadier general.; 1st South Carolina Volunteers, colonel, January 27, 1861.
	Hampton, Wade	Brigadier general rank, nom: May 23, 1862 conf: September 30, 1862; Major general rank: August 3, 1863 nom: September 3, 1863 conf: January 25, 1864; Lieutenant general rank, nom: February 14, 1865 conf: February 15, 1865	South Carolina legislator.; Organized and equipped Hampton's Legion, colonel, July 12, 1861.; Head wound at First Bull Run.; Wounded at Seven Pines, Brandy Station.; Severely wounded, twice, at Gettysburg.; Succeeded to command of cavalry corps after Jeb Stuart's death at Yellow Tavern.; Overland Campaign.; Siege of Petersburg until January 1865, then with Joseph E. Johnston in Carolinas.
	Hanson, Roger W. "Flintlock", "Bench Leg"	Brigadier general rank: December 13, 1862 nom: December 20, 1862 conf: April 22, 1863 (posthumous)	Mexican–American War.; Kentucky legislator, 1853–1857.; Colonel, Kentucky State Guard, August 19, 1861.; 2nd Kentucky Infantry, colonel, September 3, 1861.; Captured at Fort Donelson.; Exchanged for Michael Corcoran, August 15, 1862.; Mortally wounded in a charge at Stones River, January 2, 1863.; Died two days later near the battlefield, aged 35.; Posthumous confirmation.; Eicher, Warner list as a general.
	Hardee, William Joseph "Reliable"	Brigadier general rank, nom: June 17, 1861 conf: August 28, 1861; Major general rank, nom: October 7, 1861 conf: December 13, 1861; Lieutenant general rank, nom: October 10, 1862 conf: October 13, 1862	USMA, 1838.; Mexican–American War, captured and exchanged, wounded.; Published a standard textbook on infantry tactics.; Commandant of USMA, July 22, 1856–September 8, 1860.; Resigned as lieutenant colonel, U.S. Army, January 31, 1861.; Colonel ACSA Cavalry, March 16, 1861.; Wounded at Shiloh.; Opposed Sherman's March to the Sea.
	Hardeman, William Polk "Gotch"	Brigadier general rank: March 17, 1865 nom, conf: March 18, 1865	Texas War of Independence; Mexican–American War.; 4th Texas Cavalry: captain, May 1861, lieutenant colonel, March 28, 1862, colonel, January 1863.; Sibley's New Mexico expedition, Valverde.; Red River campaign.
	Harris, Nathaniel H.	Brigadier general rank: January 20, 1864 nom: February 8, 1864 conf: February 17, 1864	19th Mississippi Infantry: captain, June 1, 1861, lieutenant colonel, November 24, 1862, colonel, May 5, 1863.; Wounded at Frayser's Farm, Second Battle of Bull Run.
	George P. Harrison Jr.	Brigadier general rank: 1865	Although he received a provisional appointment to that rank, it was never officially confirmed before the end of hostilities. See incomplete appointments section in List of American Civil War generals (Acting Confederate).
	Harrison, James E.	Brigadier general rank: December 22, 1864 nom: December 29, 1864 conf: January 6, 1865	Brother of Thomas Harrison.; Two-term Mississippi senator.; Member of Texas secession convention.; 1st Texas Infantry, major, 1861.; 15th Texas Infantry: lieutenant colonel, May 1862, colonel, CSA, 1864.
	Harrison, Thomas "Ironsides"	Brigadier general (temporary) rank: January 14, 1865 nom: February 6, 1865 conf: February 18, 1865	Brother of James E. Harrison.; Mexican–American War.; Texas legislator.; 8th Texas Cavalry, captain, May 18, 1861, major, September 7, 1861, lieutenant colonel, 1862, Colonel, November 18, 1862.; Wounded at Monroe's Crossroads.
	Hatton, Robert Hopkins	Colonel; Brigadier general not confirmed: killed 8 days after appointment	See incomplete appointments section in List of American Civil War generals (Acting Confederate).: Warner lists as a general; Eicher does not.
	Hawes, James Morrison	Brigadier general rank: March 5, 1862 nom: March 11, 1862 conf: March 13, 1862 re-conf: March 18, 1862	USMA, 1845.; Mexican–American War.; Resigned as captain, U.S. Army, May 9, 1861.; 2nd Kentucky Cavalry, colonel, June 26, 1861.; Relieved after Shiloh at own request. Commanded a brigade in Vicksburg campaign.; In charge of Galveston fortifications, 1864.
	Hawthorn, Alexander T.	Brigadier general rank: February 18, 1864 nom: February 23, 1864 conf: May 11, 1864	Mexican–American War.; 6th Arkansas Infantry: lieutenant colonel, June 5, 1861, colonel, October 15, 1861.; Wounded at Shiloh.; 39th Arkansas Infantry: colonel, November 4, 1862.; Commanded a brigade in Red River campaign.
	Hays, Harry T.	Brigadier general rank, nom: July 25, 1862 conf: September 30, 1862	Mexican–American War.; 7th Louisiana Infantry, colonel, June 5, 1861.; Wounded at Port Republic.; Severely wounded at Spotsylvania.; Upon recovery assigned to Trans–Mississippi.; Assigned to duty as major general by E. Kirby Smith in May 1865, not officially promoted.
	Hébert, Louis	Brigadier general rank, nom: May 26, 1862 conf: September 30, 1862	USMA, 1845.; First cousin of Paul Octave Hebert.; Resigned from U.S. Army in 1845.; Militia officer.; Louisiana State senator.; 1st Louisiana Heavy Artillery, colonel, February 5, 1861.; 3rd Louisiana Infantry, colonel, May 11, 1861.; Wounded and captured at Pea Ridge, March 7, 1862.; Exchanged, March 20, 1862.; Captured at Vicksburg, July 4, 1863.; Exchanged October 13, 1863.; In charge of artillery at Fort Fisher.
	Hébert, Paul Octave	Brigadier general nom: August 16, 1861 rank, conf: August 17, 1861 re-nom: February 10, 1864 re-conf: June 6, 1864	USMA, 1836.; First cousin of Louis Hebert.; First in class at USMA.; Resigned from U.S. Army in 1845.; Mexican–American War.; Governor of Louisiana, January 22, 1853–January 30, 1856.; 1st Louisiana Artillery: colonel, February 5, 1861.; Department of Texas, August 14, 1861–May 26, 1862.; Only significant battle was Milliken's Bend.
	Helm, Benjamin Hardin	Brigadier general rank, nom: March 14, 1862 conf: March 18, 1862	Kentucky Military Institute.; Resigned as 2nd lieutenant, U.S. Army, October 9, 1852.; Married Mary Todd Lincoln's half sister.; Kentucky legislator.; Commonwealth attorney.; Declined Union major, paymaster commission.; 1st Kentucky Cavalry: colonel, October 5, 1861.; Horse fell on him at Baton Rouge, August 5, 1862.; Mortally wounded at Chickamauga, September 20, 1863; died the following day, aged 32.
	Heth, Henry	Brigadier general rank, conf: January 6, 1862 nom: January 9, 1862; Major general rank: May 24. 1863 nom: May 23, 1863 conf: February 17, 1864	USMA, 1847.; Resigned as captain, U.S. Army, April 25, 1861.; Lt. colonel, acting quartermaster, Provisional Army of Virginia, April 29, 1861.; 45th Virginia Infantry Regiment: lieutenant colonel, May 31, 1861, colonel, June 17, 1861.; Wounded at Chancellorsville.; Heth's troop movement, without orders, started Battle of Gettysburg.; Severely wounded, skull fracture, at Gettysburg but was in all further battles of Army of Northern Virginia.; Said to be only general addressed by first name by Robert E. Lee.
	Higgins, Edward	Brigadier general rank: October 29, 1863 nom: November 2, 1863 conf: February 17, 1864	Midshipman in the Navy from age 14 and at sea for most of 18 years.; 1st Louisiana Artillery, captain, April 12, 1861.; Aide to Twiggs when he commanded at New Orleans, from June 12, 1861.; 21st Louisiana Infantry: lieutenant colonel, February 13, 1862.; Captured at Forts Jackson and St. Philip, April 28, 1862.; Exchanged October 16, 1862.; As colonel, commanded river batteries at Vicksburg.; Captured and exchanged, October 13, 1863.; Harbor defenses at Mobile; relieved at some time before February 1865.
	Hill, Ambrose Powell	Brigadier general rank, conf: February 26, 1862 nom: February 24, 1862; Major general rank, nom: May 26, 1862 conf: September 27, 1862; Lieutenant general rank: May 24, 1863 nom: May 23, 1863 conf: January 15, 1864	USMA, 1847.; Mexican–American War.; Seminole Wars.; Resigned as 1st lieutenant, U.S. Army, March 1, 1861.; 13th Virginia Infantry Regiment: colonel, May 22, 1861.; Timely reinforced Lee at Antietam.; Wounded at Chancellorsville.; In field command at first day at Gettysburg, although sick at start of battle.; Corps had severe casualties at Bristoe Station.; Killed by Union straggler during Confederate withdrawal at Petersburg, April 2, 1865, aged 39.
	Hill, Benjamin J.	Brigadier general (temporary) rank, nom: November 30, 1864 conf: December 1, 1864	Tennessee state senator.; 5th Regiment, Provisional Army of Tennessee, which became 35th Tennessee Infantry: Captain, June 1861, colonel, August 30, 1862.; Wounded at Richmond, Kentucky.; Provost marshal of Army of Tennessee in late 1863 through Atlanta campaign.; Brigade command under Forrest in campaign against Wilson.
	Hill, Daniel Harvey	Brigadier general rank, nom: July 10, 1861 conf: August 28, 1861; Major general rank, conf: March 26, 1862 nom: March 25, 1862; Lieutenant general (acted as); July 11, 1863–October 15, 1863	USMA, 1842.; Mexican–American War veteran.; Resigned as 1st lieutenant and brevet major, U.S. Army, February 28, 1849.; 1st "Bethel Regiment" North Carolina Infantry, colonel, May 19, 1861.; In command at Big Bethel (wounded).; Appointed lieutenant general on July 11, 1863, but due to his criticism of Braxton Bragg, Davis refused to nominate Hill for confirmation at that grade.; Brief service during Siege of Petersburg, then no service until January 21, 1865.; Commanded division at Bentonville.
	Hindman, Thomas Carmichael	Brigadier general rank, nom: September 28, 1861 conf: December 13, 1861; Major general rank: April 14, 1862 nom: April 16, 1862 conf: April 18, 1862	Mexican–American War.; Mississippi State legislator.; U.S. House of Representatives from Arkansas, March 4, 1859–March 3, 1861.; 2d Arkansas Infantry: colonel, June 21, 1861.; Commanded Trans–Mississippi before Holmes.; Wounded at Chickamauga.; Incapacitated by wounds from Battle of Atlanta.
	Hodge, George B.		See incomplete appointments section in List of American Civil War generals (Acting Confederate). Warner lists as a general; Eicher does not (nominations rejected).
	Hogg, Joseph L.	Brigadier general nom: February 12, 1862 conf: February 13, 1862 rank: February 14, 1862	Congress of Republic of Texas.; Mexican–American War.; Texas State senator.; Member of Texas secession convention.; Major general, Texas Militia, 1861.; Colonel, CSA, Texas Infantry, February 1, 1861.; Organized troops in Texas.; Ordered to Corinth, Mississippi, after Shiloh.; Fell ill of dysentery soon after arriving at Beauregard's camp at Corinth and died May 16, 1862, aged 55.
	Hoke, Robert F.	Brigadier general rank: January 17, 1863 nom: January 23, 1863 conf: April 23, 1863; Major general rank: April 20, 1864 nom: April 23, 1864 conf: May 11, 1864	Kentucky Military Institute.; 1st "Bethel Regiment" North Carolina Infantry, Private.; Fought at Big Bethel as 2nd lieutenant, April 22, 1861, 1st North Carolina Volunteers.; Mustered out November 14, 1861.; 33rd North Carolina Infantry: major, November 27, 1861, lieutenant colonel, March 1862.; Wounded at Fredericksburg.; Severely wounded at Chancellorsville.; Captured Union garrison at Plymouth, North Carolina.
	Holmes, Theophilus Hunter "Granny"	Brigadier general rank, nom: June 5, 1861 conf: August 28, 1861; Major general rank, nom: October 7, 1861 conf: December 13, 1861; Lieutenant general rank, nom: October 10, 1862 conf: October 13, 1862	USMA, 1829.; Mexican–American War.; Resigned as major, U.S. Army, April 22, 1861.; Colonel, North Carolina Coastal Defenses, April 22, 1861.; Brigadier general, North Carolina Militia, May 27, 1861.; After First Bull Run and Seven Days' battles, commanded Trans–Mississippi Department until relieved by E. Kirby Smith.
	Holtzclaw, James T.	Brigadier general (temporary) rank: July 7, 1864 nom: July 8, 1864 conf: February 21, 1865	Appointed to USMA but did not enter.; Lieutenant of a militia company.; 18th Alabama Infantry: 1st lieutenant, May 1861, major, August 1861, lieutenant colonel, December 23, 1861, Colonel, May 19, 1862.; Shot through the lung at Shiloh, recovered in 90 days.; Colonel, served at Mobile.; Thrown from horse at Chickamauga.; Wounded at Franklin, in command of rear guard during part of retreat.
	Hood, John Bell "Sam", "Wooden Head"	Brigadier general rank: March 3, 1862; nom: March 5, 1862; conf: March 6, 1862; Major general rank, nom: October 10, 1862 conf: October 11, 1862; Lieutenant general rank: September 20, 1863 nom: February 1, 1864; conf: February 4, 1864; General (temporary); July 18, 1864–January 23, 1865	USMA, 1853.; Resigned as 1st lieutenant, U.S. Army, April 16, 1861.; 4th Texas Infantry, colonel, September 30, 1861.; Lost arm at Gettysburg.; Lost leg at Chickamauga.; Promoted to full general with temporary rank on July 18, 1864.; Lost several battles in Atlanta Campaign after he relieved Joseph E. Johnston in July 1864.; Abandoned Atlanta and began Franklin–Nashville Campaign.; Army of Tennessee was shattered at Franklin and Nashville.; Relieved of command in January 1865 and reverted to permanent rank of lieutenant general.; Surrendered himself at Natchez, Mississippi, paroled, May 31, 1865.; Died, along with wife and one child, August 30, 1879, of yellow fever at New Orleans, Louisiana, aged 48.
	Huger, Benjamin	Brigadier general rank, nom: June 17, 1861 conf: August 28, 1861; Major general rank, nom: October 7, 1861 conf: December 13, 1861	USMA, 1825.; Chief of ordnance for Winfield Scott in Mexican–American War.; Resigned as major, U.S. Army, April 22, 1861, after fall of Fort Sumter.; Brigadier general, Virginia Militia and Provisional Army of Virginia.; In command at Norfolk, Virginia from May 23, 1861.; Dismantled fortifications, set fire to Navy Yard and scuttled Merrimac before abandoning Norfolk in May 1862.; Censured for actions in command of division at Seven Pines.; Assigned as inspector of artillery and ordnance.; Assigned to Trans–Mississippi Department for most of remainder of war.
	Humes, William Y.C.	Brigadier general rank: November 16, 1863 nom: November 17, 1863 conf: January 25, 1864	VMI, 1851.; CSA 1st lieutenant, May 13, 1861, captain, June 1861, of artillery.; Captured at Island No. 10, April 7, 1862.; Exchanged September 1862.; Chief of artillery for Wheeler from March 1863.; Wounded at Farmington, Tennessee, October 7, 1863.; Wounded at Monroe Crossroads, March 10, 1865.; In division command in last months of the war but no record of promotion to major general.
	Humphreys, Benjamin Grubb	Brigadier general rank: August 12, 1863 nom: August 14, 1863 conf: January 25, 1864	Dismissed from USMA after Christmas Eve 1826 cadet riot.; Mississippi legislator.; Initially opposed secession.; 21st Mississippi Infantry: captain, May 18, 1861, colonel, September 11, 1861.; Wounded at Berryville, Virginia, September 1864.
	Hunton, Eppa	Brigadier general rank: August 9, 1863 nom: August 12, 1863 conf: January 25, 1864	Commonwealth attorney.: Virginia militia brigadier general, 1857–1861. Member of Virginia secession convention.; Brigadier general, Virginia Provisional Army, April 17, 1861–June 8, 1861.; 8th Virginia Infantry Regiment, colonel, May 8, 1861.; Wounded at Gettysburg.; Held off Union attack for some time at Five Forks.; Captured at Sailor's Creek.

== I ==
Image	Name	Rank	Notes
	Imboden, John Daniel	Brigadier general (New units) rank: January 28, 1863 nom: April 11, 1863 conf: April 13, 1863	Virginia legislator for two terms; Captain of Staunton Artillery at capture of Harper's Ferry; Perforated ear drum, wounded at First Bull Run; Artillery, Valley District, March 1862; Organized 1st Virginia Partisan Rangers (62nd Virginia Mounted Infantry), colonel, September 9, 1862.; Raided northwestern Virginia, severed Baltimore and Ohio Railroad, captured thousands of cattle and horses.; Helped save trains of Army of Northern Virginia at Williamsport after Gettysburg.; Captured Union garrison at Charlestown, West Virginia.; Ill from typhoid fever in fall 1864, remainder of war on prison duty at Aiken, South Carolina and other camps.
	Iverson, Alfred Jr.	Brigadier general rank, nom: November 1, 1862 returned to committee April 22, 1863 nom: June 6, 1864 conf: June 10, 1864	Son of Georgia Senator Alfred Iverson.; Tuskegee Military Institute.; Mexican–American War, 2nd lieutenant, age 17.; Regular Army commission in 1855.; Resigned as 1st lieutenant, U.S. Army, March 21, 1861.; 20th North Carolina Infantry, colonel, August 20, 1861.; Wounded at Gaines Mill.; Criticized for sacrificing men at Gettysburg.; Led cavalry brigade in Atlanta campaign.; Captured Union Major General George Stoneman and 500 men.

== J ==
Image	Name	Rank	Notes
	Jackson, Alfred E. "Mudwall"	Brigadier general rank: February 9, 1863 nom: March 5, 1863 conf: April 22, 1863	Major, quartermaster, staff of Zollicoffer, Paymaster, September 11, 1861.; Original brigadier general rank, nomination October 29, 1862, cancelled April 22, 1863.; Brigade commander in East Tennessee.; Captured 100th Ohio Infantry at Telford's Station, Tennessee, September 1863.; Special pardon from Andrew Johnson for kindnesses shown to his family.
	Jackson, Henry R.	Brigadier general rank, nom: June 4, 1861 conf: August 28, 1861 resigned December 2, 1861 rank, nom: September 21, 1863 conf: February 17, 1864	Mexican–American War, colonel.; Superior court judge, U.S. minister to Austria.; Prosecuted captain and owners of slave ship Wanderer in 1859.; Member of Georgia secession convention.; Confederate judge, resigned August 1861.; Served with Robert E. Lee in West Virginia.; Resigned, became major general of Georgia state troops; without a command after division taken into CSA under Conscript Act.; Recommissioned CSA brigadier general, September 21, 1863.; Captured at Nashville.
	Jackson, John K.	Brigadier general nom: January 10, 1862 rank, conf: January 14, 1862 re-conf: February 17, 1864	Georgia militia, captain; lieutenant colonel, 1861.; 5th Georgia Infantry: lieutenant colonel, April 1861, colonel, May 1861.; Commanded District of Florida after July 1, 1864.; Defense of Savannah.
	Jackson, Thomas Jonathan "Stonewall", "Jack", "Old Jack", "Bluelight"	Brigadier general rank, nom: June 17, 1861 conf: August 28, 1861; Major general rank, nom: October 7, 1861 conf: December 13, 1861; Lieutenant general rank, nom: October 10, 1862 conf: October 11, 1862	USMA, 1846. Mexican–American War.; Resigned as 1st lieutenant and brevet major, U.S. Army, February 29, 1852.; Professor at VMI, 1852–1861.; Colonel, Virginia militia.; At Battle of First Bull Run, named "Stonewall" by Barnard Bee.; Conducted Jackson's Valley Campaign, Spring 1862, tied up 3 Union armies.; Moved to Richmond for Seven Days Battles.; Turning movement helped Confederates win at Second Bull Run.; Captured 12,000-man Union garrison at Harper's Ferry.; Helped save Confederate Army at Antietam.; Commanded Confederate right wing at Fredericksburg.; Famous flank march routed Union Army at Chancellorsville.; Mistakenly mortally wounded by own men returning from night reconnaissance after first day of battle, May 2, 1863.; Died at Guinea's Station, Virginia May 10, 1863, from pneumonia after amputation of left arm, aged 39.
	Jackson, William Hicks "Red"	Brigadier general rank: December 29, 1862 nom: January 9, 1863 conf: April 22, 1863	USMA, 1856.; Resigned as 2nd lieutenant, U.S. Army, May 16, 1861.; Captain of Tennessee Heavy Artillery, July 1861.; Wounded at Belmont.; 1st (later 7th) Tennessee Cavalry, colonel, April 1, 1862.; In charge of cavalry corps of Army of Mississippi during Atlanta campaign.; In command of all Tennessee cavalry in Forrest's department, February 1865.; Led division but not promoted to major general.
	Jackson, William Lowther	Brigadier general rank: December 19, 1864 nom: December 29, 1864 conf: January 12, 1865	Second cousin of Stonewall Jackson.; Commonwealth attorney, judge, Virginia legislator, lieutenant governor of Virginia.; 31st Virginia Infantry: Enlisted as private; lieutenant colonel, June 1861; colonel, July 1861.; West Virginia campaign.; On Stonewall Jackson's staff from June 4, 1862, until April 14, 1863, when he recruited 19th Virginia Cavalry: colonel, April 17, 1863.; Active in West Virginia and Valley Campaigns of 1864.
	Jenkins, Albert Gallatin	Brigadier general rank, nom: August 5, 1862 conf: September 30, 1862	Attended VMI.; U.S. Representative, 1857–1861.; 8th Virginia Cavalry: captain, May 15, 1861, lieutenant colonel, September 24, 1861, Colonel, November 1861.; Wounded at Scarey Creek, Virginia, July 16, 1861.; Fell from horse, Piggot's Mill, West Virginia, August 25, 1861.; Elected to First Regular Confederate Congress, also promoted brigadier general, August 5, 1862; resigned from Congress.; Severely wounded at Gettysburg.; Returned to mountain command in late 1863.; Opposed Crook at Cloyd's Mountain near Dublin, Virginia, on May 9, 1864.; Wounded, captured, arm amputated, died 12 days later, May 21, 1864, at Dublin, West Virginia, aged 33.
	Jenkins, Micah	Brigadier general rank, nom: July 22. 1862 conf: September 30, 1862	South Carolina Military Academy, 1854, first in class.; 5th South Carolina Infantry: colonel.; At First Bull Run.; Wounded at Fair Oaks, Frayser's Farm.; Severely wounded at Second Bull Run.; On second day, near spot of Stonewall Jackson mortal wounding, Lt. Gen. Longstreet and Jenkins were hit by friendly fire.; Longstreet recovered; Jenkins died a few hours later, May 6, 1864, aged 28.
	Johnson, Adam Rankin "Stovepipe"		See incomplete appointments section in List of American Civil War generals (Acting Confederate). Warner lists as a brigadier general; Eicher does not.
	Johnson, Bradley Tyler	Brigadier general (temporary) rank, nom: June 28, 1864 conf: February 20, 1865	State's attorney, chairman of Maryland Democratic Party committee.; Captain CSA Maryland Volunteers, May 22, 1861.; Helped recruit 1st Maryland (Confederate) Infantry, major, June 17, 1861, lieutenant colonel, July 21, 1861, colonel, March 18, 1862.; Wounded at Antietam.; Assigned to important field duties but not promoted to brigadier general until June 28, 1864.; Executed Jubal Early's orders to McCausland to burn Chambersburg, Pennsylvania.
	Johnson, Bushrod Rust	Brigadier general rank, nom, conf: January 24, 1862 re-conf: February 17, 1864; Major general rank: May 21, 1865 nom: May 23, 1864 conf: May 26, 1864	USMA, 1840.; Seminole Wars.; Mexican–American War.; Forced to resign as 1st lieutenant, U.S. Army, October 22, 1847, for selling contraband goods.; Tennessee militia colonel of engineers, June 28, 1861.; Escaped after being captured at Fort Donelson.; Severely wounded, concussion, at Shiloh.; Division shattered at Sailor's Creek.
	Johnson, Edward "Old Allegheny", "Clubby"	Brigadier general rank, nom: December 13, 1861 conf: December 24, 1861; Major general rank: February 28, 1863 nom: March 5, 1863 conf: April 22, 1863	USMA, 1840.; Seminole Wars.; Mexican–American War.; Resigned as captain, U.S. Army, June 10, 1861.; 12th Georgia Infantry, colonel, July 2, 1861.; Wounded during Jackson's Valley campaign.; Commanded Jackson's former division at Gettysburg, the Wilderness and Spotsylvania, where captured with most of command.; Exchanged August 3, 1864.; Captured at the battle of Nashville.; Released July 22, 1865.
	Johnston, Albert Sidney	General (ACSA) rank: May 30, 1861 nom, conf: August 31, 1861	USMA, 1826.; Fought in Black Hawk War.; Resigned from U.S. Army in 1834.; Fought in Texas War of Independence as a private, rose to brigadier general.; Secretary of War of Republic of Texas, 1838–1840.; Colonel of Texas volunteers in Mexican–American War.; Reappointed to U.S. Army in 1849, served on Texas frontier and in Utah War.; Colonel and brevet brigadier general, U.S. Army.; Commanded Department of Utah, 1858–1859, then Department of the Pacific.; Resigned as colonel and brevet brigadier general, U.S. Army, May 3, 1861.; In command of all Confederate forces west of Allegheny Mountains.; Killed on the first day at Shiloh, April 6, 1862, aged 59.
	Johnston, George Doherty	Brigadier general (temporary) rank, nom: July 26, 1864 conf: February 21, 1865	Marion, Alabama mayor 1856.; Alabama legislator, 1857–1858.; 4th Alabama Infantry, 2d lieutenant, April 6, 1861.; 25th Alabama Infantry, major, January 8, 1862, colonel, September 14, 1863.; Wounded at Stones River.; At every engagement of Army of Tennessee from Shiloh to Bentonville.; Wounded at Ezra Church during Atlanta campaign.
	Johnston, Joseph E.	Brigadier general rank, conf: May 14, 1861 nom: March 15, 1861; General (ACSA) rank: July 4, 1861 nom, conf: August 31, 1861	USMA, 1829.; Seminole Wars (wounded).; Mexican–American War (wounded).; Resigned as quartermaster and brigadier general, U.S. Army, April 22, 1861.; Major general, Provisional Army of Virginia.; Brigadier general, ACSA, May 14, 1861, at Harpers Ferry.; Moved from Harpers Ferry by rail to reinforce Beauregard at First Bull Run.; General, ACSA, July 4, 1861.; Command of Army of Northern Virginia.; Wounded at Seven Pines, May 1862.; Replaced by Robert E. Lee.; In command of Department of West in 1863.; Tried to relieve Vicksburg.; Replaced Braxton Bragg in command of Army of Tennessee after Chattanooga.; In defense of Atlanta.; Replaced by John Bell Hood, July 17, 1864, because of policy of maneuver and retreat.; No more active service until appointed by Lee to oppose Sherman in Carolinas Campaign in February–April 1865.; Battle of Bentonville.; Surrendered at Bennett Place, Durham, North Carolina.
	Johnston, Robert D.	Brigadier general rank: September 1, 1863 nom: September 2, 1863 conf: February 16, 1864	North Carolina Militia, 2nd lieutenant, 1861.; 23rd North Carolina Infantry: captain, July 15, 1861, lieutenant colonel, May 31, 1862.; Wounded at Seven Pines.; 12th North Carolina Infantry, colonel, 1863.; Wounded at Gettysburg, Spotsylvania.; Died February 1, 1919, Winchester, Virginia, aged 81.
	Jones, David Rumph "Neighbor"	Brigadier general rank, nom: June 17, 1861 conf: August 28, 1861; Major general rank, conf: October 11, 1862 nom: September 26, 1862	USMA, 1846.; Mexican–American War.; Resigned as 1st lieutenant, brevet captain and assistant adjutant general, U.S. Army, February 15, 1861.; Major, commissary of subsistence, forces near Charleston, March 6, 1861– May 27, 1861.; Chief of staff to Beauregard.; First appointment to major general, to rank from March 10, 1862, rejected by Senate, September 24, 1862.; Commanded Confederate right at Burnside Bridge at Antietam; counterattacked with A.P. Hill.; Developed heart trouble and died of a heart ailment at Richmond, Virginia, January 15, 1863, aged 37.
	Jones, John Marshall "Rum"	Brigadier general rank: May 15, 1863 nom: May 16, 1863 conf: February 17, 1864	USMA, 1841.; Instructor at West Point during Mexican–American War.; Resigned as captain, U.S. Army, May 27, 1861.; Captain in Confederate Army at start of war.; Lt. colonel and assistant adjutant general, September 4, 1861.; Seriously wounded at Gettysburg and Payne's Farm in November 1863.; Killed at the Wilderness, May 5, 1864, aged 43.
	Jones, John R.		See incomplete appointments section in List of American Civil War generals (Acting Confederate).: Warner includes him on list of generals despite lack of confirmation; Eicher does not.
	Jones, Samuel	Brigadier general rank, nom: July 21, 1861 conf: August 28, 1861; Major general rank: March 10, 1862 nom: March 11, 1862 conf: March 13, 1862 (March 18, 1862)	USMA, 1841; West Point instructor during Mexican–American War and for five more years.; Resigned as captain, U.S. Army, April 27, 1861.; Lt. colonel, Virginia Provisional Army, May 9, 1861.; Captain of 1st Artillery Regiment and assistant to judge advocate.; Chief of artillery for Beauregard at First Bull Run.; Department or division commands.
	Jones, William E. "Grumble"	Brigadier general rank: September 19, 1862 nom: September 26, 1862 conf: October 3, 1862	USMA, 1848.; Resigned as 1st lieutenant, U.S. Army, 1857.; Virginia militia company captain.; 1st Virginia Cavalry, major, May 1861.; 1st, then 7th, Virginia Cavalry, colonel, September 1862.; Wounded at Orange County Courthouse.; Sent to Department of Southwest Virginia and East Tennessee after Brandy Station.; Ordered to intercept David Hunter's raid in Shenandoah Valley.; Killed at Piedmont, June 5, 1864, aged 40.
	Jordan, Thomas	Brigadier general rank: April 14, 1862 nom: April 16, 1862 conf: September 26, 1862	USMA, 1840.; USMA roommate of later Union major general, William T. Sherman.; Seminole War.; Mexican–American War.; Resigned as captain and assistant quartermaster, U.S. Army, May 21, 1861.; Entire Confederate service as a staff officer.; Brigadier general for gallantry at Shiloh.

== K ==
Image	Name	Rank	Notes
	Kelly, John Herbert	Brigadier general rank: November 16, 1863 nom: November 17, 1863 conf: February 17, 1864	Entered USMA in 1857 but resigned on December 29, 1860.; Commissioned 2d lieutenant of artillery in Confederate Regular Army.; 14th Arkansas Infantry, major, September 23, 1861.; Commanded 9th Arkansas Battalion at Shiloh.; 8th Arkansas Infantry, colonel, May 3, 1862.; Led brigade at Chickamauga.; Youngest Confederate general officer on date of appointment.; Assigned a division in Wheeler's corps.; During Atlanta campaign raid, mortally wounded in an action at Franklin, Tennessee, September 2, 1864.; Left with William H. Harrison family; died a few days later, probably September 4, 1864, aged 24.
	Kemper, James Lawson	Brigadier general rank, nom: June 3, 1862 conf: September 30, 1862; Major general rank, nom: September 19, 1864 conf: January 17, 1865	Mexican–American War.; Five terms in Virginia House of Delegates; Speaker of the House.; 7th Virginia Infantry, Colonel.; Severely wounded in Pickett's Charge.; Captured, exchanged for Charles K. Graham, September 19, 1863.; Commanded Virginia reserve forces after major general promotion.
	Kennedy, John Doby	Brigadier general (temporary) rank: December 22, 1864 nom: January 7, 1865 conf: February 8, 1865	2nd South Carolina Infantry, private, April 1861, captain, May 1861, colonel, January 1862.; Wounded at First Bull Run, four other times.; South Carolina Governor Magrath asked that brigade be sent to help Johnston oppose Sherman.
	Kershaw, Joseph Brevard	Brigadier general nom: February 1, 1862 rank, conf: February 13, 1862 re-conf: February 17, 1864; Major general rank: May 18, 1864 nom: June 1, 1864 conf: June 2, 1864	Mexican–American War.; Two-term South Carolina legislator.; Colonel, South Carolina Militia.; 2nd South Carolina Infantry: colonel, May 22, 1861.; Captured at Sailor's Creek, April 6, 1865.
	Kirkland, William W.	Brigadier general rank: August 29, 1863 nom: August 31, 1863 conf: February 16, 1864	Attended USMA, 1852–1855.; Commissioned 2nd lieutenant, U.S. Marines, 1855, resigned August 1860.; 11th North Carolina Infantry, colonel, May 28, 1861.; 21st North Carolina Infantry, colonel, July 8, 1861.; Badly wounded at First Battle of Winchester.; Chief of staff to Cleburne at Stones River while recovering.; Badly wounded at Bristoe Station.; Wounded at Gaines Mill (Cold Harbor II), June 2, 1864.; Siege of Petersburg until December 1864; Fort Fisher; Bentonville.

== L ==
Image	Name	Rank	Notes
	Lane, James H. "Little General"	Brigadier general rank, nom: November 1, 1862 conf: April 23, 1863	VMI, 1854.; 1st North Carolina Volunteers, major, May 11, 1861, lieutenant colonel, September 1, 1861.; At Battle of Big Bethel.; Reorganized; 28th North Carolina Infantry, colonel, September 15, 1861.; Wounded three times.; Brigade fought during first day at Gettysburg and in Pickett's Charge.; In 1872, became the first commandant of cadets and professor of civil engineering and commerce at Virginia Agricultural and Mechanical College (now Virginia Tech); 1881-1907 - Civil engineering professor at Alabama Polytechnic Institute (Auburn University)
	Lane, Walter P.	Brigadier general rank: March 17, 1865 nom, conf: March 18, 1865	Born February 18, 1817, County Cork, Ireland.; Fought at San Jacinto.; Mexican–American War.; 3rd Texas Cavalry, lieutenant colonel, July 2, 1861.; South Kansas and Texas Infantry, August 1861.; Severely wounded at Mansfield.; 1st Texas Partisan Rangers, colonel, 1864.; Cavalry brigade commander, March 1864–May 26, 1865.
	Law, Evander M.	Brigadier general nom: September 26, 1862 rank, conf: October 3, 1862	South Carolina Military Academy, 1856.; 4th Alabama Infantry, captain, April 1861, lieutenant colonel, May 2, 1861, colonel, October 28, 1861.; Severely wounded at First Bull Run.; Wounded at Second Bull Run.; Led Hood's division after Hood wounded at Chickamauga.; Charged with insubordination by Longstreet, November 2, 1863, additional charges April 8, 1864.; Charges dropped by Samuel Cooper, April 18, 1864.; Wounded at Cold Harbor, fractured skull and eye injury.; Relieved from Army of Northern Virginia at own request.; Commanded cavalry force under Joseph E. Johnston in the Carolinas.; New York Times obituary, other histories state promotion to major general, March 20, 1865.; Major general promotion never confirmed by Confederate Senate which last met March 18, 1865.; Died October 31, 1920, Bartow, Florida, aged 84.
	Lawton, Alexander R.	Brigadier general rank, nom: April 13, 1861 conf: August 28, 1861 re-conf: February 17, 1864	USMA, 1839.; Resigned as 2nd lieutenant, U.S. Army, December 31, 1840, to enter Harvard Law School.; Served in both houses of Georgia legislature.; 1st Georgia Militia, colonel, January 1861.; Seized Fort Pulaski, April 13, 1861.; 1st Georgia Infantry, colonel, May 27, 1861.; Badly wounded at Antietam.; Quartermaster-General from fall 1863 until end of war.
	Leadbetter, Danville	Brigadier general rank: February 27, 1862 nom: March 5, 1862 conf: March 6, 1862	Born August 26, 1811, Leeds, Maine.; USMA, 1836.; Resigned as captain, U.S. Army, at Mobile, Alabama, December 31, 1857.; Chief engineer of Alabama.; Mainly an engineer officer in Confederate Army.; Supervised building defenses at Mobile, Chattanooga, Knoxville.; E. P. Alexander criticized Leadbetter's work at Knoxville.; Chief engineer for Joseph Johnston.
	Lee, Edwin Gray "Ned"	Colonel; Brigadier general rank: September 20, 1864 nom: September 23, 1864 conf: February 3, 1865 reconsidered; rejected February 24, 28, 1865; March 1, 1865	Son-in-law of William N. Pendleton.; Second cousin of Robert E. Lee.; Aide to Stonewall Jackson at Harper's Ferry, 1861.; 2nd Virginia Infantry, 2nd lieutenant, May 1861.; 33rd Virginia Infantry, major, April 1861, lieutenant colonel, July 25, 1862, colonel, August 28, 1862.; Captured at Shepherdstown, September 1862.; Exchanged December 1862.; Resigned due to ill health, December 1862.; Recommissioned colonel in 1863, duty at Richmond, Virginia, including judge advocate.; In command at Staunton, Virginia for defense of Shenandoah Valley, May 17, 1864.; Given six-month leave of absence for health, November 28, 1864, but apparently moved to Canada as secret agent.; Warner, Eicher list as a general despite recall.; Ran blockade with wife just before end of war to Montreal, Canada.; Died from "disease of the lungs," August 24, 1870, Yellow Springs, Virginia, aged 34.
	Lee, Fitzhugh	Brigadier general rank: July 24, 1862 nom: July 25, 1862 conf: September 30, 1862; Major general rank" August 3, 1863 nom: September 3, 1863 conf: January 25, 1864	USMA, 1856.; Wounded fighting Indians on the frontier, May 13, 1859.; Nephew of Samuel Cooper and Robert E. Lee.; Resigned as 1st lieutenant, U.S. Army, May 21, 1861.; Assistant adjutant general, July 30, 1861–August 1861.; Staff of Joseph E. Johnston at First Bull Run.; 1st Virginia Cavalry, lieutenant colonel, August 1861, colonel, March 1862.; After Wade Hampton ordered to North Carolina in January 1865, Lee commanded rest of Cavalry Corps of Army of Northern Virginia.; Wounded twice.; U.S. Consul General to Havana, Cuba, 1896–1898.; Major general of U.S. Volunteers in the Spanish–American War.; Retired as brigadier general, U.S. Army, 1901.
	Lee, George Washington Custis	Brigadier general rank, nom: June 25, 1863 local volunteers; not acted on Major general rank, nom: October 20, 1864 re-nom: January 18, 1865 conf: February 24, 1865	Eldest son of Robert E. Lee.; USMA, 1854.; First in class at USMA, engineer officer.; Resigned as 1st lieutenant, U.S. Army, May 2, 1861.; Captain of engineers, constructed Richmond, Virginia defenses.; Commissary of subsistence, Army of the Northwest, August 1, 1861–August 31, 1861.; Served on staff of Jefferson Davis with the rank of colonel, August 31, 1861–June 25, 1863.; Commanded Richmond Local Defense Forces and Local Defenses, June 25, 1863–March 1865.; No active field service until organized clerks and mechanics to defend Richmond near end of war. Captured at Sailors Creek, April 6, 1865
	Lee, Robert E.	Brigadier general (ACSA) rank, conf: May 14, 1861 nom: May 15, 1861; General (ACSA) rank: June 14, 1861 nom, conf: August 31, 1861	Son of Henry Lee III (Light-Horse Harry Lee).; USMA, 1829; Second in class.; Married Mary Ann Randolph Custis, great grand–daughter of Martha Washington, June 30, 1831.; Mexican–American War, fought with Major General Winfield Scott.; Supervised construction or improvement of Forts Pulaski, Monroe, Hamilton and Carroll.; Superintendent of USMA, 1855–1857.; 2nd U.S. Cavalry, lieutenant colonel, 1857–1861.; Led U.S. Marine detachment against John Brown at Harper's Ferry, October 1859.; Resigned as colonel, U.S. Army, April 20, 1861.; Commander of Virginia land and naval forces.; Major general and commander in chief of Provisional Army of Virginia, April 22, 1861–June 8, 1861.; Led West Virginia Campaign, September 21, 1861–November 5, 1861.; Examined South Atlantic seaboard defense, November 5, 1861–March 4, 1862.; Military adviser to Jefferson Davis, March 13, 1862–May 31, 1862.; Command of Army of Northern Virginia, June 1, 1862–April 9, 1865.; Given command of all Confederate armies, January 23, 1865.; Opposed guerrilla warfare after surrender.; President of Washington College, later Washington and Lee University.; Died October 12, 1870, Lexington, Virginia, aged 63.
	Lee, Stephen Dill	Brigadier general rank, nom: November 6, 1862 conf: April 22, 1863; Major general rank, nom: August 3, 1863 conf: February 17, 1864; Lieutenant general rank, nom: June 23, 1864 cancelled: February 23, 1865 re-nom: March 11, 1865 conf: March 16, 1865	USMA, 1854.; Resigned as 1st lieutenant and regimental quartermaster, U.S. Army, February 20, 1861.; Assistant adjutant general, assistant inspector general, Charleston forces, March 6, 1861–April 11, 1861.; Captain and aide to Beauregard, April 11, 1861– June 1861.; 4th Virginia Cavalry, Captain June 1861, major, November 1861, lieutenant colonel, March 1862. Colonel, July 9, 1862.; Served in artillery through Antietam.; Assigned to Pemberton at Vicksburg.; Captured July 4, 1863.; Exchanged October 13, 1863.; Command of cavalry in Department of Mississippi, Alabama, West Tennessee and East Louisiana.; Youngest Confederate lieutenant general.; Assumed command of Hood's old corps when Hood succeeded Johnston as commander of Army of Tennessee.; Wounded at Spring Hill, Tennessee.
	Lee, William Henry Fitzhugh "Rooney"	Brigadier general rank: September 15, 1862 nom: September 26, 1862 conf: October 3, 1862; Major general rank, nom: April 23, 1864 conf: June 9, 1864	Second oldest son of Robert E. Lee. Commissioned into U.S. Army for two years, resigned as 2nd lieutenant, May 31, 1857.; Captain, Virginia Provisional Army, May 10, 1861.; 9th Virginia Cavalry: major, May 1861, lieutenant colonel, January 18, 1862, colonel, April 28, 1862.; Participated in most campaigns of Cavalry Corps of the Army of Northern Virginia.; Unhorsed and run over, Boonsboro, Maryland, September 15, 1862.; Severely wounded at Brandy Station, June 1863.; Captured while recovering, at Hickory Hill, Virginia, June 26, 1863.; Exchanged February 25, 1864, for Neal Dow.
	Leventhorpe, Collett	Brigadier general (special) rank: February 3, 1865 nom: February 14, 1865 conf: February 18, 1865 declined: March 6, 1865	Captain in British Army.; Moved to North Carolina; married into prominent family.; 34th North Carolina Infantry, colonel, October 25, 1861.; 11th North Carolina Infantry, colonel, April 2, 1862.; Badly wounded at Gettysburg, captured.; Exchanged March 10, 1864.; Then, appointed brigadier general of North Carolina state forces and operated on the Roanoke River and Weldon Railroad until the end of the war.; For unknown reasons, declined appointment as brigadier general, CSA, on March 6, 1865; remained with state troops collecting stragglers.; Warner, Eicher list as a general.
	Lewis, Joseph Horace	Brigadier general rank: September 30, 1863 nom: October 1, 1863 conf: January 25, 1864	Three-term Kentucky legislator.; Colonel, Kentucky Militia.; 6th Kentucky Infantry, colonel, November 1, 1861.; Command of Orphan Brigade after death of Ben Hardin Helm.; After fall of Atlanta, brigade was mounted, attached to Wheeler's cavalry corps.; Opposed Sherman's March to the Sea, Carolinas campaign.; Surrendered as part of Jefferson Davis's escort
	Lewis, William Gaston	Brigadier general (temporary) rank: May 31, 1864 nom, conf: June 2, 1864	Served in Bethel Regiment, 1st North Carolina Infantry, from April 21, 1861.; 33rd North Carolina Infantry, major, January 17, 1862.; 43rd North Carolina Infantry, lieutenant colonel, April 25, 1862, colonel, April 22, 1863.; Wounded at Stephenson's Depot, Virginia, July 20, 1864.; Wounded and captured at Farmville, April 7, 1865.
	Liddell, St. John Richardson	Brigadier general rank: July 12, 1862 nom: July 17, 1862 conf: September 30, 1862	Killed two men in duels, 1852.; Colonel, aide for Hardee, September 15, 1861– January 1862.; Confidential courier for Albert Sidney Johnston, January 1862– April 6, 1862.; Aide to Beauregard, April 6, 1862–June 14, 1862.
	Lilley, Robert Doak	Brigadier general (temporary) rank: May 31, 1864 nom, conf: June 2, 1864	25th Virginia Infantry, captain, May 25, 1861, major, January 28, 1863, lieutenant colonel, August 20, 1863.; Wounded 3 times.; Captured near Winchester, Virginia when wounded in July 1864 reconnaissance.; Arm amputated, released July 24, 1864.; In charge of reserve units in Shenandoah Valley thereafter.
	Little, Lewis Henry	Brigadier general nom: April 5, 1862 rank, conf: April 16, 1862	Commissioned directly into U.S. Army, 1839.; Mexican–American War.; Resigned as captain, U.S. Army, May 7, 1861.; Major of artillery, May 1861.; Colonel and assistant adjutant general on staff of Sterling Price, August 1861.; Missouri State Guard, May 18, 1861–January 23, 1862, colonel, assistant adjutant general.; While talking with Price, Louis Hebert and Whitfield at Iuka, September 19, 1862, a ball struck Little in the forehead, killing him instantly.
	Logan, Thomas Muldrup	Brigadier general (temporary) nom: December 1, 1864; Brigadier general rank: February 15, 1865 nom: February 22, 1865 conf: February 23, 1865	Hampton's Legion, 1st lieutenant, May 1861, captain, July 1861, major, September 17, 1862, lieutenant colonel, December 1862, colonel, May 19, 1864.; Wounded at Gaines Mill and at Riddell's Shop, Virginia, June 13, 1864.; Original promotion to brigadier general was not confirmed by congress.; Commanded brigade in South Carolina with Wade Hampton III.
	Lomax, Lunsford L.	Brigadier general rank: July 23, 1863 nom: July 30, 1863 conf: February 17, 1864; Major general (temporary) rank, nom: August 10, 1864 conf: February 20, 1865	USMA, 1856.; Resigned as 1st lieutenant, U.S. Army, April 25, 1861.; Staff officer until 1863.; Inspector general of Army of West Tennessee.; 11th Virginia Cavalry, colonel, February 8, 1863.; Commanded cavalry in Valley Campaign of 1864, including Winchester, Cedar Creek.; President of Virginia Agricultural and Mechanical College 1886–1891
	Long, Armistead L.	Brigadier general (artillery) rank, nom: September 21, 1863 conf: February 17, 1864	USMA, 1850.; Resigned as aide to U.S. Brig. Gen. Edwin V. Sumner, Sr., and as 1st lieutenant, U.S. Army, June 10, 1861.; Major of artillery, July 1861, in Confederate service, then staff officer, April 21, 1862.; Became military secretary to Robert E. Lee when Lee took command of Army of Northern Virginia.; Assigned to command artillery of 2nd Corps, September 23, 1863–April 9, 1865.
	Longstreet, James "Pete", "Old Pete"	Brigadier general rank, nom: June 17, 1861 conf: August 28, 1861; Major general rank, nom: October 7, 1861 conf: December 13, 1861; Lieutenant general rank: October 9, 1862 nom: October 10, 1862 conf: October 11, 1862	USMA, 1842.; Indian Wars.; Mexican–American War (wounded).; Resigned as major and Paymaster, U.S. Army, June 1, 1861.; Fought at First Bull Run.; Occupied Marye's Heights at Fredericksburg.; Commanded right wing at Gettysburg.; Served at Chickamauga, Knoxville.; On May 6, 1864, during the battle of the Wilderness, He was shot from behind with the bullet passing through both his shoulder and neck by his own men during a counterattack that drove back the advancing 2nd Corps under Hancock.; Last of Confederate full and permanent lieutenant generals to die, January 2, 1904, Gainesville, Georgia, aged 83.
	Loring, William Wing "Blizzards"	Brigadier general rank, nom: May 20, 1861 conf: August 28, 1861; Major general rank, nom: February 15, 1862 conf: February 17, 1862	Seminole Wars.; Florida state legislator.; Lost arm in Mexican–American War.; Stayed in regular army, youngest U.S. Army colonel at time of Civil War.; Resigned as colonel, U.S. Army, May 13, 1861.; Relieved of duty by Stonewall Jackson because of arguments during Romney Expedition.; In command in Southwest Virginia.; Then in Mississippi, cut off from Vicksburg at Baker's Creek and escaped capture.; Wounded at Ezra Church, Georgia, July 28, 1864.
	Lovell, Mansfield	Major general rank, nom: October 7, 1861 conf: December 13, 1861	USMA, 1842.; Mexican–American War (wounded twice). Resigned as 1st lieutenant and brevet captain, U.S. Army, December 18, 1854.; Deputy street commissioner in New York City.; Not appointed as brigadier general; immediate major general appointment.; Assigned to New Orleans, but had to evacuate city due to attack by superior Union forces.; At Second Battle of Corinth.; No further assignments despite requests by Joseph E. Johnston and Hood.; Deputy commander in chief of Georgia militia, May 1864–September 1864.; Volunteer aide to Johnston.
	Lowrey, Mark Perrin	Brigadier general rank: October 4, 1863 nom: October 6, 1863 conf: February 17, 1864	Son of Irish immigrants.; Mexican–American War.; Commanded 4th Mississippi State Troops, Army of 10,000, then colonel 32nd Mississippi Infantry in 1862.
	Lowry, Robert	Brigadier general rank: February 4, 1865 nom: February 8, 1865 conf: February 13, 1865	Mississippi legislator.; 6th Mississippi Infantry: private, May 1861, major, August 1861, colonel, May 23, 1862.; Twice wounded at Shiloh.; Assistant adjutant general, November 5, 1863–July 1864.; Promoted to brigadier general after death of John Adams at Franklin.
	Lyon, Hylan B.	Brigadier general rank, nom, conf: June 14, 1864	USMA, 1856.; Resigned as 1st lieutenant, U.S. Army, April 30, 1861.; Battery captain, 1st Kentucky Artillery Battalion, September 30, 1861.; 8th Kentucky Infantry, lieutenant colonel, January 24, 1862.; Taken prisoner at Fort Donelson.; Exchanged August 15, 1862, after 7 months.; 8th Kentucky Infantry, colonel, October 7, 1862.; Escaped with command from Vicksburg.; Temporary command of all artillery at Chattanooga.; Commanded brigade of 4 Kentucky regiments under Forrest near end of war.

== M ==
Image	Name	Rank	Notes
	Mackall, William W.	Brigadier general rank: February 27, 1862 nom: March 5, 1862 conf: March 6, 1862	USMA, 1837.; Severely wounded in Seminole War. Mexican–American War.; Resigned as major and assistant adjutant general, U.S. Army, July 3, 1861.; Lt. colonel, assistant adjutant general, staff of Albert Sidney Johnston, September 9, 1861.; Captured at Island No. 10, April 7, 1862.; Exchanged August 15, 1862.; Chief of staff to Bragg, April 1863.; Relieved at own request after Chickamauga.; Chief of staff to Joseph E. Johnston.; Declined to serve under Hood.; Assigned to Macon, Georgia, South Georgia forces, last two months of war.
	MacRae, William	Brigadier general (special) rank: November 4, 1864 nom: November 5, 1864 conf: January 17, 1865	15th North Carolina Infantry: private, May 1861, captain, June 11, 1861, lieutenant colonel May 2, 1862, colonel, February 27, 1863.; Often with Army of Northern Virginia.
	Magruder, John Bankhead "Prince John"	Brigadier general rank, nom: June 17, 1861 conf: August 28, 1861; Major general rank: October 7, 1861 nom: October 7, 1861 conf: December 13, 1861	USMA, 1830.; Wounded in Mexican–American War.; Resigned as captain and brevet lieutenant colonel, U.S. Army, April 20, 1861.; Colonel, Virginia Provisional Army, May 9, 1861, With forces at Richmond, May 8, 1861, then Hampton Line.; Distinguished in Peninsula Campaign, deceived and delayed McClellan.; Less successful in Seven Days Battles.; Assigned to duty in Texas.; Defended Galveston and dispersed Union fleet, January 1, 1863.
	Mahone, William "Little Billy"	Brigadier general rank, nom: November 16, 1861 conf: December 13, 1861 re-conf: February 17, 1864; Major general rank: July 30, 1864 nom: August 3, 1864 conf: January 17, 1865	VMI, 1847.; 6th Virginia Infantry: lieutenant colonel, April 20, 1861, colonel, May 2, 1861.; Major general for successful defense of Confederate line at the Crater at Petersburg.
	Major, James Patrick	Brigadier general rank: July 21, 1863 nom: July 23, 1863 conf: February 17, 1864	USMA, 1856.; Resigned as 2nd lieutenant, U.S. Army, March 21, 1861.; Missouri State Guard: lieutenant colonel, 1861, colonel 1861–1862.; Acting chief of artillery for Van Dorn at Vicksburg, 1862.; Wounded at Donaldsonville, Louisiana, June 28, 1863.
	Maney, George Earl	Brigadier general rank, nom: April 16, 1862 conf: April 18, 1862	Mexican–American War.; Tennessee legislator.; 11th Tennessee Infantry: captain, May 1861.; 1st Tennessee Infantry, colonel, May 8, 1861.; Temporary command of Cheatham's division.; Relieved of command, August 31, 1864, when wounded.; Wounded at Ringgold, Georgia, and Jonesboro, Georgia.
	Manigault, Arthur Middleton	Brigadier general rank: April 26, 1863 nom: April 27, 1863 conf: April 30, 1863	Wounded in Mexican–American War.; Captain of militia company, supervised construction of Charleston harbor batteries.; Assistant adjutant general, aide to Beauregard during attack on Fort Sumter, April 1861–May 1861.; 10th South Carolina Infantry, colonel, May 31, 1861.; Wounded at Resaca, Georgia.; Severe head wound at Franklin, incapacitated.
	Marmaduke, John Sappington	Brigadier general rank: November 15, 1862 nom: May 25, 1863 conf: February 17, 1864; Major general rank: March 17, 1865 nom, conf: March 18, 1865	USMA, 1857.; Resigned as 2nd lieutenant, U.S. Army, April 17, 1861.; Colonel, Missouri militia, 1861. 1st Arkansas Battalion: lieutenant colonel, September 19, 1861.; 18th Arkansas Infantry (3rd Confederate Infantry), essentially a state based unit, colonel, January 28, 1862.; Wounded at Shiloh.; Raided Missouri twice.; Killed Lucius M. Walker in a duel.; Original major general appointment to rank from April 30, 1864, not nominated.; Jefferson Davis nullified E. Kirby Smith's May 13, 1864, appointment of Marmaduke to command as a brigadier general.; Captured at Mine Creek, Kansas, October 25, 1864.; Paroled July 24, 1865.; Although a prisoner of war, appointed, confirmed major general, March 18, 1865, the last Confederate major general appointment.
	Marshall, Humphrey	Brigadier general rank, nom: October 30, 1861 conf: December 13, 1861	USMA, 1832.; Resigned as brevet 2nd lieutenant, U.S. Army, 1833.; Mexican–American War.; U.S. Congressman from Kentucky, March 4, 1849–August 4, 1853; March 4, 1855–March 3, 1859.; U.S. minister to China, March 4, 1849–1854.; Minor victory at Princeton, West Virginia.; Resigned as brigadier general, June 16, 1862.; Reappointed four days later.; Resigned June 17, 1863.
	Martin, James Green "One Wing"	Brigadier general rank: May 15, 1862 nom: August 11, 1862 conf: September 30, 1862	USMA, 1840.; Mexican–American War, lost right arm.; Resigned as captain and brevet major, June 14, 1861.; Adjutant general of North Carolina state troops, September 27, 1861.; Major general of militia in North Carolina, September 28, 1861.; Resigned July 25, 1862.; Reappointed brigadier general August 11, 1862, and confirmed as of first date appointed.; In command of District of North Carolina.; Fought at Siege of Petersburg.; Health broke, put in command of District of Western North Carolina.
	Martin, John Donelson		See incomplete appointments section in List of American Civil War generals (Acting Confederate).
	Martin, William T.	Brigadier general rank, nom: December 2, 1862 conf: April 22, 1863; Major general rank: November 10, 1863 nom: November 12, 1863 conf: January 25, 1864	Captain, Mississippi Cavalry, July 8, 1861.; Jeff Davis Legion, major, October 24, 1861.; 2nd Battalion, Mississippi Cavalry: lieutenant colonel, February 13, 1862, colonel, July 1862.; Commanded rear third of Jeb Stuart's cavalry force in ride around McClellan.; Led a division under Wheeler in Atlanta campaign.; Command of District of Northwest Mississippi at end of war.
	Maury, Dabney Herndon "Little Dab", "Puss-in-Boots"	Brigadier general rank: March 12, 1862 nom: March 14, 1862 conf: March 18, 1862; Major general rank, nom: November 4, 1862 conf: April 22, 1863	USMA, 1846.; Wounded in Mexican–American War.; Dismissed as 1st lieutenant, brevet captain and assistant adjutant general, U.S. Army, June 25, 1861.; 20th Mississippi Infantry, lieutenant colonel, August 28, 1861.; Colonel and chief of staff to Van Dorn.; Brief service at Vicksburg, in East Tennessee.; Then command at Mobile, Alabama until end of war.; Founder of Southern Historical Society in 1868.
	Maxey, Samuel Bell	Brigadier general rank: March 4, 1862 nom: March 5, 1862 conf: March 6, 1862	USMA, 1846.; Mexican–American War.; Resigned as 2nd lieutenant and brevet 1st lieutenant, U.S. Army, September 17, 1849, to study law.; Texas state senator.; 9th Texas Infantry, colonel, May 1861.; Fought in East Tennessee, at Port Hudson, in Red River Campaign.; Assigned to duty as major general by E. Kirby Smith on April 18, 1864, but not appointed by Jefferson Davis.
	McCausland, John "Tiger John"	Brigadier general rank: May 18, 1864 nom: May 21, 1864 conf: May 24, 1864	VMI, 1857.; Virginia Militia, colonel, May 3, 1861.; 36th Virginia Infantry: colonel, July 16, 1861.; In West Virginia Campaign.; Escaped with command from Fort Donelson before surrender.; In 1864, assumed command at Cloyd's Mountain after Albert Jenkins's death.; Fought in Valley Campaigns of 1864.; Burned Chambersburg, Pennsylvania, on orders of Jubal Early in retaliation for Union Army destruction of property in Shenandoah Valley.; Cut way out of Appomattox before surrender.; Paroled at Charleston, West Virginia.; Last surviving Confederate general.; Died January 22, 1927, near Henderson, West Virginia.
	McComb, William	Brigadier general rank: January 20, 1865 nom: February 7, 1865 conf: February 13, 1865	14th Tennessee Infantry: private, May 1861, 2nd lieutenant, May 1861, major, April 26, 1862, lieutenant colonel, August 15, 1862, Colonel, September 2, 1862.; Wounded at Cold Harbor I, June 27, 1862.; Severely wounded at Antietam, Chancellorsville.; Died July 21, 1918, near Gordonsville, Virginia, aged 89.
	McCown, John P.	Brigadier general rank, nom: October 12, 1861 conf: December 13, 1861; Major general rank: March 10, 1862 nom: March 11, 1862 conf: March 13, 1862 re-conf: March 18, 1862	USMA, 1840.; Mexican–American War.; Resigned as captain, U.S. Army, May 17, 1861.; Tennessee Artillery Corps: lieutenant colonel, May 9, 1861, colonel, May 17, 1861.; Brigade command, September 7, 1861.; Temporary command of Army of the West.; Command in East Tennessee.; Bragg preferred charges against him for disobedience of orders at Stones River.; Served out the war without significant command.; Defended Catawba River crossing in April 1865 with one artillery piece and 300 men against a division of Union cavalry.
	McCulloch, Ben	Brigadier general rank, nom, conf: May 11, 1861	Elder brother of Henry E. McCulloch.; Battle of San Jacinto.; Wounded in duel with future Confederate Colonel Reuben Ross in 1839.; Mexican–American War.; Texas militia, colonel, major general.; Received Twiggs's surrender at San Antonio.; Brigadier general in command in Arkansas.; Killed at Pea Ridge, March 7, 1862, aged 51, while directing the right wing of the army.
	McCulloch, Henry Eustace	Brigadier general rank, nom: March 14, 1862 conf: March 18, 1862	Younger brother of Ben McCulloch.; Mexican–American War.; Texas state legislator.; U.S. marshal.; 1st Texas Mounted Riflemen, colonel, April 15, 1862.; Served almost entirely within Texas except Vicksburg relief campaign, Milliken's Bend.
	Peter A. S. McGlashan	Brigadier general rank: April 1865 {See Note}	Commsison signed By Jefferson Davis but never set to Confedrate Congress for Confirmation See incomplete appointments section in List of American Civil War generals (Acting Confederate).
	McGowan, Samuel	Brigadier general rank: January 17, 1863 nom: January 23, 1863 conf: April 23, 1863	Mexican–American War.; South Carolina state legislator, 13 years.; Major general of South Carolina militia.; Aide to Milledge L. Bonham, March 1861– July, 1861.; 14th South Carolina Infantry, lieutenant colonel, September 9, 1861, colonel, August 11, 1862.; Wounded four times: Cold Harbor I, June 27, 1862; Second Bull Run; Chancellorsville; Spotsylvania.
	McIntosh, James M.	Brigadier general rank, nom: November 4, 1862 conf: January 24, 1862	USMA, 1849.; Son of U.S. Col. James S. McIntosh, mortally wounded at Battle of Molino Del Ray in Mexican–American War.; Brother of Union Brevet Major General John B. McIntosh, a graduate of U.S. Naval Academy.; Last in class at USMA.; Resigned as captain, U.S. Army, May 7, 1861.; 2nd Arkansas Mounted Rifles, colonel, May 1, 1861.; Aide to Ben McCulloch, July 29, 1861.; Wounded at Wilson's Creek.; Killed at Pea Ridge, March 7, 1862, aged 34.
	McLaws, Lafayette	Brigadier general rank, nom: September 25, 1861 conf: December 13, 1861; Major general rank, nom: May 23, 1862 conf: September 27, 1862	USMA, 1842.; Nephew of Zachary Taylor.; Wounded in Mexican–American War.; Resigned as captain, U.S. Army, March 23, 1861.; Assistant quartermaster in Georgia, April 18, 1861–June 1861.; 10th Georgia Infantry, colonel, June 17, 1861.; Relieved by Longstreet because of insubordination, failure of assault at Fort Sanders in Knoxville campaign.; Court martial charges ordered dropped by Samuel Cooper, January 5, 1864.; Restored to command by Jefferson Davis.; Court-martialed by Braxton Bragg for neglect of duty, February 3, 1864, found guilty May 4, 1864.; Returned to duty by Jefferson Davis the same day.; Assigned to command in Georgia and under Joseph E. Johnston.
	McNair, Evander	Brigadier general rank, nom: November 4, 1862 conf: April 22, 1863	Mexican–American War.; 4th Arkansas Infantry, captain, August 17, 1861, lieutenant colonel, May 1861, colonel, October 29, 1861.; Brigade command August 25, 1862.; Wounded at Chickamauga.
	McRae, Dandridge	Brigadier general rank, nom: November 5, 1862 conf: April 22, 1863	Inspector General of Arkansas on staff of Governor Henry Massey Rector, 1861.; 3rd Battalion Arkansas Infantry, major, July 15, 1861.; 21st Arkansas Infantry, lieutenant colonel, December 3, 1861, colonel, January 1862.; Resigned commission in late 1864.
	Mercer, Hugh Weedon	Brigadier general rank, nom: October 29, 1861 conf: December 20, 1861 re-conf: June 10, 1864	USMA, 1828.; Grandson of Revolutionary War general, Hugh Mercer.; Resigned as 1st lieutenant, U.S. Army, April 30, 1835.; 1st Georgia Infantry, colonel, April 13, 1861.; Accompanied Hardee to Savannah after Battle of Jonesboro due to ill health and had no more field duty.
	Miller, William	Brigadier general (temporary) rank: August 2, 1864 nom: August 5, 1864 conf: February 20, 1865	Mexican–American War.; Commanded battalion of 6 companies as major, 1861.; 1st Florida Infantry, major, April 1862, colonel, August 15, 1862.; Initial brigade command, October 8, 1862.; Wounded at Perryville.; Seriously wounded at Stones River.; Brigadier general in command of Florida reserve forces.; Commanded District of Florida.
	Moody, Young Marshall	Brigadier general rank: March 4, 1865 nom: March 11, 1865 conf: March 13, 1865	11th Alabama Infantry, captain, May 1861.; 43rd Alabama Infantry: lieutenant colonel, April 1862, colonel, November 4, 1862.; Severely wounded at Battle of Drewry's Bluff.; Brigade command after Gracie's death, December 2, 1864.
	Moore, John Creed	Brigadier general rank: May 26, 1862 nom: September 19, 1862 re-nom: March 2, 1863 conf: April 11, 1863 recalled: April 13, 1863	USMA, 1849.; Seminole Wars.; Resigned as 1st lieutenant, U.S. Army, February 28, 1855.; Captain, Louisiana Artillery, March 24, 1861.; Defenses of Galveston, June 25, 1861–October 2, 1861.; 2nd Texas Infantry: colonel, September 2, 1861.; Initial brigade command, May 1862.; Brigadier general confirmation recalled and tabled.; Captured at Vicksburg, July 4, 1863.; Exchanged October 16, 1863.; Resigned from Confederate Army, February 3, 1864.
	Moore, Patrick T.	Brigadier general rank: September 20, 1864 nom: September 23, 1864 conf: January 17, 1865	Born September 22, 1821, Galway, Ireland.; 1st Virginia Militia, colonel, April 21, 1861.; Virginia Provisional Army, colonel, June 15, 1861.; 1st Virginia Infantry: colonel, July 1, 1861.; Severely wounded and incapacitated for field duty at Blackburn's Ford, Virginia, July 18, 1861, 3 days before First Bull Run.; Volunteer aide to Joseph E. Johnston at Seven Pines and to Longstreet at Seven Days Battles.; Helped organize Virginia reserve forces in 1864, brigade commander, May 18, 1864.; At end of war, commanded brigade of Ewell's Richmond local defense troops.
	Morgan, John Hunt "Thunderbolt"	Brigadier general rank, nom: December 11, 1862 conf: April 22, 1863	Two of his sisters married A. P. Hill and Basil Duke.; Mexican–American War.; Kentucky Militia Captain, 1852–1854 and 1857–1861.; 2nd Kentucky Cavalry, captain, September 1861, colonel, April 2, 1862.; First brigade command, October 31, 1862.; Conducted a series of raids in Tennessee, Kentucky, Indiana and Ohio.; Raided into Ohio in 1863.; Captured near New Lisbon, Ohio.; Imprisoned in Ohio State Penitentiary with several officers.; Escaped, made way south.; In command in East Tennessee, December 1863– May 2, 1864, Trans–Allegheny Department (Virginia), May 2, 1864–August 22, 1864.; Killed at Greeneville, Tennessee, garden of house where had been sleeping, on way to attack at Knoxville, September 3, 1864, aged 39.
	Morgan, John Tyler	Brigadier general rank: November 16, 1863 nom: November 17, 1863 conf: February 17, 1864	Enlisted as private, Alabama infantry, April 1861.; 5th Alabama Infantry, major, May 5, 1861.; Resigned in May 1862.; Major of cavalry.; 51st Alabama Partisan Rangers, colonel, August 11, 1862.; Declined first offer to command Rodes's old brigade as brigadier general July 14, 1863.; Resigned 1863.; 51st Alabama Cavalry, colonel, September 1863.; First brigade command, September 1863.; Opposed Sherman's march across Georgia.
	Mouton, Jean J.A.A.	Brigadier general rank, nom: April 16, 1862 conf: April 18, 1863	Son of Louisiana ex-governor and U.S. Senator Alexander Mouton.; USMA, 1850.; Resigned soon after graduation; Brigadier general of state militia, 1850–1861.; Captain, ACSA Infantry, March 16, 1861.; Resigned July 16, 1861.; 18th Louisiana Infantry, colonel, October 5, 1861.; First brigade command, April 1862.; Dangerously wounded at Shiloh.; Led a brigade under Richard Taylor.; In command of his brigade and de Polignac's brigade at Mansfield during Red River campaign.; Killed leading a charge, April 8, 1864, Mansfield, Louisiana, aged 35.
	Thomas T. Munford	Brigadier general rank: November 9, 1864 {See Note}	Appointed but never officially commissioned: however he is listed as a brigadier general in command of Fitzhugh Lee's Division, Cavalry Corps of Maj Gen Fitzhugh Lee after the surrender of the Army of Northern Virginia April 1865 See incomplete appointments section in List of American Civil War generals (Acting Confederate).

== N ==
Image	Name	Rank	Notes
	Nelson, Allison	Brigadier general rank: September 12, 1862 nom, conf: September 26, 1862	Mayor of Atlanta.; Georgia state legislator, 1848–1849; 1859–1860.; Mexican–American War.; Texas state legislator.; Fought Indians.; 10th Texas Infantry, colonel, September 1861.; First brigade command June 1862.; Assigned to command two brigades under Holmes the day after falling ill of typhoid (camp) fever.; Died, October 7, 1862, Austin, Texas, aged 40.
	Nicholls, Francis Redding Tillou	Brigadier general rank, nom: October 14, 1862 conf: April 22, 1863	USMA, 1855.; Resigned as 2nd lieutenant, U.S. Army, October 1, 1856, to study law.; 8th Louisiana Infantry: captain, May 1861, lieutenant colonel, June 9, 1861.; Wounded at Winchester and lost left arm.; Captured May 26, 1862.; Exchanged for Samuel M. Bowman, September 30, 1862.; 15th Louisiana Infantry, colonel, July 24, 1862.; Left foot torn off at Chancellorsville; leg amputated.; Commanded at Lynchburg, Virginia August 11, 1863–May 17, 1864.; Command of volunteer and conscript bureau in Trans–Mississippi Department.
	Northrop, Lucius B.		See incomplete appointments section in List of American Civil War generals (Acting Confederate). Shown on full general list by Wright, Warner; not listed as general by Eicher.

== O ==
Image	Name	Rank	Notes
	O'Neal, Edward Asbury	Brigadier general rank: June 9, 1863 {Canceled}	See incomplete appointments section in List of American Civil War generals (Acting Confederate).

== P ==
Image	Name	Rank	Notes
	Page, Richard Lucian "Ramrod", "Bombast"	Brigadier general rank: March 1, 1864 nom: March 7, 1864 conf: June 9, 1864	First cousin of Robert E. Lee.; Midshipman in U.S. Navy, 1824.; Executive officer of Norfolk Navy Yard.; Dismissed as commander, U.S. Navy, April 18, 1861.; Designed and supervised construction of works on James River and Nansemond River.; In naval battle of Port Royal, South Carolina.; Transferred to Confederate States Army.; In command of outer defenses of Mobile Bay.; Surrendered after Union attack, August 1864.; Captured at Fort Morgan, Alabama, August 23, 1864.; Died August 9, 1901, aged 93.
	Palmer, Joseph B.	Brigadier general rank: November 15, 1864 (temporary) nom: December 3, 1864 conf: December 7, 1864	Tennessee state legislator, 1849–1853.; Mayor of Murfreesboro, 1855–1859.; 18th Tennessee Infantry: captain, May 1861, colonel, June 1861.; Captured at Fort Donelson, February 16, 1862.; Exchanged August 15, 1862.; Initial brigade command, October 20, 1862.; Wounded three times at Stones River.; Severely wounded at Chickamauga, returned for Atlanta campaign.; Wounded at Jonesboro.; Brigade in rear guard after Nashville.; Wounded at Bentonville
	Parsons, Mosby M.	Brigadier general rank, nom: November 5, 1862 conf: April 30, 1863	Mexican–American War.; Attorney general of Tennessee, 1853–1857.; Commanded 6th Division, Missouri State Guard until April 9, 1862.; Then commander-in-chief of Missouri State Guard.; Assigned to duty as major general by General E. Kirby Smith, April 30, 1864, but never officially appointed.
	Paxton, Elisha F. "Bull"	Brigadier general rank, nom: November 1, 1862 conf: April 22, 1863	27th Virginia Infantry, 1st lieutenant of Rockbridge Rifles, April 18, 1861, major, October 14, 1861.; In Jackson's Valley campaign of 1862 as a major on Stonewall Jackson's staff.; Assigned as brigadier general to command the Stonewall Brigade, September 1, 1862.; Killed at Chancellorsville, May 3, 1863, aged 35.
	Payne, William H.F.	Brigadier general rank: November 1, 1864 nom: November 4, 1864 conf: January 17, 1865	VMI, 1848.; 4th Virginia Cavalry: private, captain, April 26, 1861, major, September 17, 1861.; Wounded and captured at Williamsburg, May 1862.; Exchanged August 15, 1862.; 2nd North Carolina Cavalry: lieutenant colonel.; Wounded and captured at Hanover, Pennsylvania, June 30, 1863, during Gettysburg campaign.; Exchanged May 8, 1864.; Wounded at Five Forks.; Captured near Warrenton on night of President Lincoln's assassination.
	Peck, William R. "Big Peck"	Brigadier general rank: February 18, 1865 nom., conf: February 22, 1865	9th Louisiana Infantry: private, July 7, 1861, captain, 1861, lieutenant colonel, April 24, 1862, colonel, October 8, 1863.; Commanded brigade with rank of colonel in several actions including Monocacy.; Eicher says wounded at Winchester, Virginia, September 19, 1864.; Warner says repeatedly placed himself in danger in battle but never wounded.
	Pegram, John	Brigadier general rank: November 7, 1862 nom: November 10, 1862 conf: April 23, 1863	USMA, 1854.; Resigned as 1st lieutenant, U.S. Army, May 10, 1861.; 20th Virginia Infantry, lieutenant colonel, July 1861.; Wounded at Rich Mountain.; Captured at Elkins, (West) Virginia, two days later, July 13, 1861.; Exchanged January 24, 1862, for James M. Bomford.; Colonel, chief engineer, staffs of Beauregard, Bragg.; Army of Northern Virginia after Chickamauga.; Commanded infantry brigade at the Wilderness, where wounded.; Valley Campaigns of 1864.; Commanded Rodes's division after Rodes's death at Winchester; not formally promoted to major general.; Killed at Dabney's Mill (Hatcher's Run), February 6, 1865, aged 33.
	Pemberton, John Clifford	Brigadier general rank, nom: June 17, 1861 conf: August 28, 1861; Major general nom: January 10, 1862 rank, conf: January 14, 1862; Lieutenant general rank, conf: October 10, 1862 conf: October 13, 1862	Born August 10, 1814, Philadelphia, Pennsylvania.; USMA, 1837.; Wounded in Mexican–American War.; Wife was from Norfolk, Virginia.; Resigned as captain, U.S. Army, April 29, 1861.; Assistant adjutant general, forces in and around Richmond, April 29, 1861.; Colonel, May 8, 1861.; Major, artillery, June 15, 1861.; Surrendered Vicksburg on July 4, 1863, and captured.; Exchanged October 13, 1863.; No further duty for his rank.; Resigned as a general officer on May 9, 1864.; Then lieutenant colonel of artillery.; Inspector general of artillery, January 7, 1865.
	Pender, William Dorsey	Brigadier general rank, nom: July 22, 1862 conf: September 30, 1862; Major general rank: May 27, 1863 unconfirmed: died	USMA, 1854.; Resigned as captain, U.S. Army, March 21, 1861.; 3rd (later 13th) North Carolina Infantry, colonel, May 27, 1861; Transferred to 6th North Carolina Infantry, August 6, 1861.; Wounded five times before Gettysburg.; Initial brigade command May 27, 1862.; Division command at Gettysburg.; Mortally wounded on the second day.; Died at Staunton, Virginia, July 18, 1863, aged 29.
	Pendleton, William N.	Brigadier general nom: March 25, 1862 rank, conf: March 26, 1862	USMA, 1830.; Resigned as 2nd lieutenant, U.S. Army, October 31, 1833.; Virginia Artillery, captain, May 1, 1861, colonel, July 13, 1861.; Wounded at First Bull Run.; Chief of Artillery of Joseph E. Johnston.; Wounded twice.; Nominal chief of artillery of Army of Northern Virginia; mainly administrative work in last two years of war.
	Perrin, Abner Monroe	Brigadier general rank: September 10, 1863 nom: September 17, 1863 conf: February 17, 1864	Mexican–American War.; 14th South Carolina Infantry: captain, July 1861, colonel, February 20, 1863.; Wounded at Fredericksburg.; Killed at Spotsylvania Court House, May 12, 1864, aged 37, leading men to reinforce Confederate line after Union forces took Mule Shoe salient.
	Perry, Edward Aylesworth	Brigadier general rank: August 28, 1862 nom: September 15, 1862 conf: September 30, 1862	2nd Florida Infantry: captain, May 1861, colonel, May 1862.; Severely wounded at Battle of Frayser's Farm.; Led Florida brigade at Chancellorsville.; Contracted typhoid fever.; Returned for start of Overland campaign.; Severely wounded at the Wilderness.; Upon return, assigned to reserve forces of Alabama.
	Perry, William F.	Brigadier general rank: February 21, 1865 nom: February 28, 1865 conf: March 16, 1865	Self-taught.; Twice elected as Alabama's first superintendent of public instruction.; President, East Alabama Female College, 1858–1862.; 44th Alabama Infantry: private, May 6, 1862, major, May 16, 1862, lieutenant colonel September 1, 1862, colonel, September 17, 1862.; Wounded at Gettysburg, New Market Heights.; After Cold Harbor II, led Law's former brigade until surrender at Appomattox Court House.
	Pettigrew, James Johnston	Brigadier general nom: February 24, 1862 rank, conf: February 26, 1862	South Carolina legislator.; Colonel South Carolina Militia.; Served in Charleston Harbor at fall of Fort Sumter.; 1st South Carolina Rifles, Hampton's Legion, private, April 1861, colonel, April 1861.; 12th (22nd) North Carolina Infantry, colonel, July 11, 1861.; Wounded and captured at Seven Pines.; Exchanged August 15, 1862.; Defenses of Petersburg and North Carolina.; Commanded Heth's division after Heth was wounded at Gettysburg.; Led division against center of Union Army line on Cemetery Ridge at Gettysburg in charge on third day known as Pickett's Charge.; Mortally wounded, July 14, 1863, Falling Waters, Maryland, commanding rear guard of Army of Northern Virginia in retreat from Gettysburg.; Died July 17, 1863, Bunker Hill, Virginia, aged 35.
	Pettus, Edmund Winston	Brigadier general rank: September 18, 1863 nom: September 19, 1863 conf: February 17, 1864	20th Alabama Infantry, major, September 9, 1861, lieutenant colonel, October 8, 1861, colonel May 28, 1863.; Captured December 29, 1862; exchanged.; Captured at Fort Gibson, May 1, 1863, escaped.; Captured at Vicksburg, July 4, 1863.; Exchanged September 12, 1863.; Wounded at Bentonville.
	Pickett, George E.	Brigadier general nom: January 10, 1862 rank, conf: January 14, 1862; Major general rank, nom: October 10, 1862 conf: October 11, 1862	USMA, 1846, last in class.; Mexican–American War.; Defied British in 1859 in occupation of San Juan Island.; Resigned as captain, U.S. Army, June 25, 1861.; Colonel, Artillery, July 23, 1861.; Severely wounded at Gaines Mill.; Advanced his division against center of Union line on Cemetery Ridge on third day at Gettysburg on July 3, 1863.; Action became known as Pickett's Charge.; Later commanded Department of Virginia and North Carolina.; Defense of Petersburg.; Defeated by Sheridan at Five Forks while away from front line for most of battle.; Relieved of command after Sailor's Creek.
	Pike, Albert	Brigadier general nom: August 13, 1861 rank: August 15, 1861 conf: August 16, 1861	Mexican–American War.; Fought an inconclusive duel with John S. Roane, July 29, 1847.; Responsible for recruiting Native American (Indian) troops.; Pike was blamed for dubious conduct of Native American troops at Pea Ridge.; Resigned July 12, 1862, resignation accepted November 11, 1862.; Masonic Scottish Rite Sovereign Grand Master, 1859–1891.
	Pillow, Gideon J.	Brigadier general rank, nom: July 9, 1861 conf: August 28, 1861 re-conf: February 17, 1864	Law partner of President James K. Polk.; Brigadier general of volunteers in Mexican–American War, wounded.; Second in command at Fort Donelson.; Passed command to Simon Buckner after John B. Floyd passed command to him.; Escaped with Floyd before surrender.; Relieved of duty by Jefferson Davis, April 16, 1862.; Resignation accepted October 21, 1862, rescinded December 10, 1862.; Assigned to volunteer and conscript bureau in Tennessee.; Commissary General of prisoners from February 1865 after death of John Winder.
	De Polignac, Camille A.J.M. "Pole-Cat"	Brigadier general rank, nom: January 10, 1863 conf: April 23, 1863; Major general rank: April 8, 1864 nom: June 11, 1864 conf: June 13, 1864	French Army lieutenant, 1853–1859.; Crimean War.; In Central America when war began; moved to Louisiana.; Lt. colonel, July 16, 1861, on staffs of Beauregard and Bragg.; Served in Louisiana with Richard Taylor.; Assistant inspector general, Army of Mississippi, July 17, 1862–July 1863.; Initial brigade command, July 1863.; Ran blockade March 17, 1865, in order to urge Napoleon III to intervene on behalf of the Confederacy.; Led 1st French Division in Franco-Prussian War.; Awarded the Legion of Honor.; Died November 15, 1913, Paris, France, last survivor of Confederate major generals.
	Polk, Leonidas	Major general rank, nom: June 25, 1861 conf: August 28, 1861; Lieutenant general rank, nom: October 10, 1862 conf: October 11, 1862	Uncle of Lucius E. Polk.; USMA, 1827.; Resigned as brevet 2nd lieutenant, U.S. Army, December 1, 1827.; Became an Episcopal bishop.; Army of Tennessee corps commander.; Censured by Bragg for dilatory tactics at Chickamauga.; Killed by Union artillery shell at Pine Mountain, Georgia, near Marietta, Georgia, during the Atlanta campaign on June 14, 1864 while in the company of Joseph E. Johnston and Hardee, aged 58.
	Polk, Lucius E.	Brigadier general rank: December 13, 1862 nom: December 20, 1862 conf: April 22, 1863	Nephew of Leonidas Polk.; 15th Arkansas Infantry: private, May 1861, 2nd lieutenant, January 1862, colonel, April 11, 1862.; Succeeded Patrick Cleburne in brigade command, December 14, 1862.; Wounded at Shiloh, Richmond, Kentucky, Perryville.; Severely wounded for the fourth time at Kennesaw Mountain in June 1864.; Retired from Army, July 1864.
	Posey, Carnot	Brigadier general rank: November 1, 1862 nom: March 5, 1863 conf: April 22, 1863	Mexican–American War, wounded.; President Buchanan appointed him U.S. District Attorney for Southern District of Mississippi, 1858–1861.; Captain of Wilkinson Rifles, Captain Mississippi infantry, May 21, 1861.; 16th Mississippi Infantry, colonel, June 4, 1861.; Wounded at Cross Keys.; Initial brigade command August 30, 1862.; Mortally wounded at Bristoe Station, October 14, 1863.; Died November 13, 1863, Charlottesville, Virginia, aged 45.
	Preston, John S.	Brigadier general rank, nom, conf: June 10, 1864	South Carolina state senator for 8 years.; Lived abroad, 1856–1860.; Lt. colonel and assistant adjutant general to Beauregard at Fort Sumter, First Bull Run.; Colonel, April 23, 1863.; Served in command of prison camps, conscript camps.; From July 30, 1863, superintendent of bureau of conscription, Richmond, Virginia.
	Preston, William	Brigadier general rank: April 14, 1862 nom: April 16, 1862 conf: April 18, 1862	Mexican–American War.; Elected to both houses of Kentucky legislature.; U.S. Representative from Kentucky, December 6, 1852–March 3, 1855.; Minister to Spain, 1858–1861.; Colonel, on staff of brother-in-law, Albert Sidney Johnston, until Johnston was killed at Shiloh.; In 1864, appointed Confederate minister to Imperial Mexican government but could not reach Maximilian's court.; Remainder of war in Trans–Mississippi Department.; No record of supposed promotion to major general.
	Price, Sterling "Old Pap"	Major general rank, nom, conf: March 6, 1862	Six years in Missouri legislature; speaker for four years.; U.S. Representative from Missouri, March 4, 1846–August 12, 1846.; Mexican–American War.; Military governor of New Mexico.; Governor of Missouri, January 3, 1853–January 5, 1857.; Disagreed with extreme Unionists and joined pro-Confederate Missouri State Guard as major general, May 18, 1861–March 17, 1862.; Combined with Ben McCulloch at Wilson's Creek to defeat Nathaniel Lyon.; Captured Lexington, Missouri, and 3,000 prisoners.; Appointed major general without previous appointment to brigadier general.; Wounded at Wilson's Creek, Pea Ridge. Iuka, Second Corinth.; Failed to retake Helena, Arkansas.; Aided E. Kirby Smith in repulsing Camden Expedition.; Raided Missouri in September–October, 1864.; Defeated at Westport.
	Pryor, Roger Atkinson	Brigadier general nom: April 1, 1862 rank, conf: April 16, 1862	U.S. Commissioner to Greece, 1855–1857.; U.S. Congressman, December 7, 1859–March 3, 1861.; Resigned from Provisional Confederate Congress to join army as aide to Beauregard and Jefferson Davis, April 1861.; 3rd Virginia Infantry, colonel, April 20, 1861.; CSA Provisional Congress and Representative from Virginia, January 15, 1862–April 5, 1862.; Resigned to rejoin army, April 5, 1862.; Resigned August 18, 1863, and served as a special courier and spy without rank for the cavalry.; Captured as private, 3rd Virginia Cavalry, November 27, 1864, not released until paroled (but not exchanged) February 25, 1865, by order of President Lincoln.; Went to New York in 1865.; Prominent lawyer and judge.; Died March 14, 1919, New York, New York, aged 90.

== Q ==
Image	Name	Rank	Notes
	Quarles, William Andrew	Brigadier general rank: August 25, 1863; nom. September 5, 1863; conf. January 25, 1864	Major, assistant adjutant general, October 24, 1861.; 42nd Tennessee Infantry, colonel, November 28, 1861.; Captured at Fort Donelson, February 16, 1862.; Exchanged September 30, 1862.; Wounded in Atlanta campaign.; Wounded at Franklin, November 30, 1864.; Captured near Franklin, December 18, 1864.

== R ==
Image	Name	Rank	Notes
	Rains, Gabriel J.	Brigadier general rank, nom: September 23, 1861 conf: December 13, 1861	USMA, 1827.; Brevet major for Seminole Wars.; Lt. colonel, 5th U.S. Infantry, June 5, 1860; resigned July 31, 1861.; In withdrawal from Yorktown, he devised and deployed the anti-personnel mine.; Longstreet forbade further use of mines during campaign.; Was severely criticized by A. P. Hill for Seven Pines and relieved.; First superintendent of the volunteer and conscript bureau, December 1862–May 1863.; Bureau apparently a cover for Confederate States Navy Torpedo Bureau.; Set up mine and torpedo defenses at several cities and harbors.
	Rains, James Edwards		See incomplete appointments section in List of American Civil War generals (Acting Confederate). Warner lists as a general; Eicher does not.
	Ramseur, Stephen Dodson	Brigadier general rank, nom: November 1, 1862 conf: April 22, 1863; Major general (temporary) nom: May 31, 1862 rank, conf: June 1, 1862.	USMA, 1860.; Resigned as 2nd lieutenant, U.S. Army, April 6, 1861.; 3rd North Carolina Infantry, captain, May 1861, lieutenant colonel, May 27, 1861.; Thrown from horse and broke collarbone, July 25, 1861.; 49th North Carolina Infantry, colonel, April 12, 1862.; Wounded at Malvern Hill, Chancellorsville, Spotsylvania Court House.; With General Jubal Early in Valley Campaigns of 1864.; Mortally wounded at Cedar Creek, October 19, 1864.; Captured, died the next day, aged 27.
	Randolph, George Wythe	Brigadier general rank, nom, conf: February 12, 1862	Born at Monticello, the home of his maternal grandfather, Thomas Jefferson.; Midshipman in Navy, age 13, served for 6 years.; Resigned from U.S. Navy, 1839.; Organized Richmond Howitzers artillery battery after John Brown's raid on Harpers Ferry.; Colonel and chief of artillery for Magruder at Big Bethel, June 1861.; 1st Virginia Artillery, September 1861, Colonel.; Artillery, Department of Norfolk, February 1862.; Confederate Secretary of War, March 18, 1862.; Resigned November 17, 1862.; Soon diagnosed with tuberculosis.; Went to France for his health.; Resigned as brigadier general November 15, 1862.; Resigned Army commission, December 18, 1864.; Returned to Virginia after the war. Died of tuberculosis and pneumonia, April 3, 1867, aged 59.
	Ransom, Matt Whitaker	Brigadier general rank: June 13, 1863 nom: June 15, 1863 conf: February 16, 1864	North Carolina legislator, 1858–1861.; 1st North Carolina Infantry, private, May 1861, lieutenant colonel, May 16, 1861.; 35th North Carolina Infantry, colonel, April 21, 1862, part of younger brother's, Robert Ransom Jr.'s, brigade.; Wounded three times.
	Ransom, Robert Jr.	Brigadier general rank: March 1, 1862 nom: March 5, 1862 conf: March 6, 1862; Major general rank: May 26, 1863 nom: May 27, 1863 conf: February 17, 1864	USMA, 1850.; Younger brother of Matt Whitaker Ransom.; Resigned as captain and regimental adjutant, U.S. Army, May 24, 1861.; 1st North Carolina Cavalry, (aka 9th North Carolina Volunteers), colonel, October 13, 1861.; Commanded cavalry during Jubal Early's raid on Washington (Fort Stevens).; Retired due to illness in fall 1864.; Command of second subdistrict, District of South Carolina, November 5, 1864–May 2, 1865.
	Reynolds, Alexander Welch "Gauley"	Brigadier general rank: September 14, 1863 nom: September 17, 1863 conf: February 17, 1864	USMA, 1838.; Seminole War.; Dropped as captain, U.S. Army as AWOL, October 4, 1861.; 50th Virginia Infantry: colonel, July 10, 1861.; Initial brigade command March 1862.; Captured and paroled at Vicksburg.; Exchanged, October 13, 1863.; Wounded at New Hope Church.
	Reynolds, Daniel H.	Brigadier general (special) rank: March 5, 1864 nom: March 12, 1864 conf: May 16, 1864	1st Arkansas Mounted Rifles, captain, May 25, 1861, major, April 14, 1862, lieutenant colonel, May 1, 1862, colonel, September 20, 1863.; Wounded at Franklin.; Lost leg at Bentonville.
	Richardson, Robert Vinkler	Colonel; Brigadier general rank: December 1, 1863 nom: December 3, 1863 conf: January 25, 1864 recalled January 27, 1864	Mexican–American War.; Brigadier general, Tennessee Militia, 1861.; 1st Tennessee Partisan Rangers (12th Tennessee Cavalry), colonel, February 19, 1863.; Wounded near Belmont, March 29, 1863.; Brigadier general, December 3, 1863, duly confirmed; nomination recalled and returned to President Davis at his request, February 9, 1864.; Operated with James R. Chalmers until the end of the war.; Warner, Eicher list as a general.
	Ripley, Roswell Sabine	Brigadier general nom: August 13, 1861 rank: August 15, 1861 conf: August 16, 1861 re-conf: June 10, 1864	USMA, 1843.; Mexican–American War, wrote two-volume history.; Nephew of Brigadier General James W. Ripley, U.S. Army chief of ordnance, 1861–1863.; Married into the Middleton family of Charleston, South Carolina, 1852.; Resigned as 1st lieutenant and brevet major, U.S. Army, March 2, 1853.; Lt. colonel of South Carolina forces in 1860.; Occupied Fort Moultrie after Major Robert Anderson moved the garrison to Fort Sumter.; Occupied Fort Sumter after its surrender.; In command in South Carolina until relieved by Pemberton.; Lt. colonel, CSA, May 1861.; Severely wounded at Antietam.; On duty in South Carolina in 1863 and 1864.; Ordered to Joseph E. Johnston's army in spring 1865.
	Roane, John Selden	Brigadier general nom: March 19, 1862 rank, conf: March 20, 1862	Arkansas State legislator, 1844, speaker.; Mexican–American War.; Fought a duel with captain, later confederate brigadier general, Albert Pike.; Governor of Arkansas, April 19, 1849–November 15, 1852.; Opponent of secession, did not take up arms immediately.; Fought at Prairie Grove.; Served in Arkansas, Louisiana and Texas in garrison and detached duty.; Died April 8, 1867, Pine Bluff, Arkansas, aged 50.
	Roberts, William Paul	Brigadier general rank: February 21, 1865 nom: February 22, 1865 conf: February 23, 1865	19th North Carolina Infantry: private, June 10, 1861, age 19, sergeant, June 1861, 1st lieutenant, November 20, 1861.; 2nd North Carolina Cavalry: 1st lieutenant, September 13, 1862, captain, November 19, 1863, major, February 18, 1864, colonel, June 23, 1864.; Wounded in head, Haw's Shop, Virginia, June 5, 1864.; Youngest general officer in Confederate service.; Brigade fought well but was overcome at Five Forks, April 1, 1865.; Died March 28, 1910, Norfolk, Virginia, aged 68.
	Robertson, Beverly Holcombe	Brigadier general rank, nom: June 9, 1862 conf: September 30, 1862	USMA, 1849.; Dismissed as captain, U.S. Army, for disloyalty, August 8, 1861.; 4th Virginia Cavalry, colonel, September 19, 1861.; Fought in Jackson's Valley Campaign of 1862.; Commanded cavalry after death of Turner Ashby.; Distrusted by Jeb Stuart.; Relieved after Gettysburg and assigned to South Carolina until evacuated at Sherman's approach.; Wounded at West Buckhead Church, Georgia, November 19, 1864.; Died November 12, 1910, Washington, D.C., aged 83.
	Robertson, Felix Huston	Colonel; Brigadier general (temporary) rank: July 26, 1864 nom: rejected: February 22, 1865	See incomplete appointments section in List of American Civil War generals (Acting Confederate). Warner lists as a general; Eicher does not.: Last surviving general officer of the Confederacy if appointment counted despite Senate rejection.
	Robertson, Jerome Bonaparte "Polly", "Aunt Polly", "Bob"	Brigadier general rank, nom: November 1, 1862 conf: April 22, 1863	Father of Felix Huston Robertson.; Army of Republic of Texas.; Member of both houses of Texas legislature.; Delegate to secession convention.; 5th Texas Infantry Regiment, captain, August 3, 1861, lieutenant colonel, October 10, 1861, colonel, September 26, 1862.; Wounded at Gaines Mill, Second Bull Run, Gettysburg.; Initial brigade command, November 6, 1862.; Court martialed for insubordination, January 26, 1864, but charges dropped.; Spent remainder of war in Texas in command of state reserve corps.
	Roddey, Philip D.	Brigadier general rank, nom: August 3, 1863 conf: January 25, 1864	Captain of a cavalry company in July 1861.; Scouting missions.; 4th Alabama Cavalry, colonel, October 1, 1862.; Served under Forrest and Wheeler.; Forrest and Roddey swam the Alabama River to escape after collapse of Confederate lines at Selma, Alabama.
	Rodes, Robert E.	Brigadier general rank, nom: October 21, 1861; December 13, 1861; Major general rank: May 2, 1863 nom: May 7, 1863 conf: February 17, 1864	VMI, 1848.; Captain, Alabama Militia, January 1861.; 5th Alabama Infantry, colonel, May 11, 1861.; Wounded at Seven Pines but fought at Gaines Mill.; Wounded at Antietam.; Led van of Stonewall Jackson's flank march at Chancellorsville.; Major general for services at Chancellorsville.; Mortally wounded at Winchester, Virginia, directing a counterattack that helped Confederate force escape, September 19, 1864, aged 35.
	Ross, Lawrence Sullivan "Sul"	Brigadier general rank: December 21, 1863 nom: January 9, 1864 conf: February 5, 1864	Fought the Comanches.; Aide to Sam Houston.; Captain in Texas Rangers, 1859.; Colonel, Texas militia.; 6th Texas Cavalry: private, April 1861, major, September 18, 1861, colonel, May 14, 1862.; Initial brigade command, September 1863.; Captured at Newnan, Georgia, July 30, 1864, but rescued the same day.
	Rosser, Thomas L. "Savior of the Valley"	Brigadier general rank: September 28, 1863 nom: October 10, 1863 conf: February 17, 1864; Major general (temporary) rank: November 1, 1864 nom: November 4, 1864 conf: February 20, 1865	USMA, resigned two weeks before graduation in 1861; 1st lieutenant, ACSA, Artillery, March 16, 1861.; CSA Artillery, captain, September 17, 1861, lieutenant colonel, June 10, 1862.; Wounded at Mechanicsville.; 5th Virginia Cavalry, colonel, June 24, 1862.; Wounded at Kelly's Ford.; Wounded five more times.; Command of Laurel Brigade.; In October 1864 assumed command of Early's cavalry.; Defeated at Woodstock and Cedar Creek.; Two raids into West Virginia, then returned to Siege of Petersburg.; Battle of Five Forks.; Refused to surrender at Appomattox Court House but was captured and paroled in May 1865.; On June 10, 1898, appointed brigadier general of U.S. Volunteers for the Spanish–American War.; Mustered out October 31, 1898.
	Ruggles, Daniel	Brigadier general nom: August 6, 1861 rank, conf: August 9, 1861 re-conf: February 17, 1864	Born in Massachusetts.; USMA, 1833.; Seminole War of 1839–1840.; Mexican–American War.; Married into a Virginia family.; Resigned as captain and brevet lieutenant colonel, U.S. Army, May 7, 1861.; Commanded Virginia state forces on Rappahannock River.; Led Bragg's First Division at Shiloh.; After Second Corinth, administrative duties, mainly in Alabama and Mississippi.; Commissary general of prisoners, March 30, 1865.
	Rust, Albert	Brigadier general rank: March 4, 1862 nom: March 5, 1862 conf: March 6, 1862	Arkansas State legislator, 1842–1848, 1852–1854.; U.S. Congressman, March 4, 1855–March 3, 1857, March 4, 1859–March 3, 1861.; CSA Provisional Congressman, May 15, 1861–February 17, 1862.; 3rd Arkansas Infantry, colonel, July 5, 1861.; Fought at Cheat Mountain under General Lee.; Served under Stonewall Jackson in winter of 1861–1862.; Fought at Second Battle of Corinth.; Sent to report to Sterling Price in April 1863.; Served under Hindman in Arkansas and Richard Taylor and Pemberton in Louisiana.

== S ==
Image	Name	Rank	Notes
	St. John, Isaac M.	Brigadier general and commissary general rank, conf: February 16, 1865 nom: February 14, 1865	Chief engineer for Magruder at Yorktown; Captain.; Major of artillery, October 1862.; In charge of Nitre (later Nitre and Mining) Corps.; Lt. colonel and colonel in 1863.; Produced crucial ordnance supplies for Confederate Army.
	Sanders, John C.C.	Brigadier general (temporary) rank: May 31, 1864 nom: June 6, 1864 conf: June 7, 1864	11th Alabama Infantry: private, April 1861, captain, June 11, 1861, colonel, September 11, 1862.; Severely wounded at Frayser's Farm.; Wounded four times before death.; Initial brigade command, August 15, 1863.; Killed during the Siege of Petersburg while fighting along the Weldon Railroad, August 21, 1864, aged 24.
	Scales, Alfred Moore	Brigadier general rank: June 13, 1863 nom: June 15, 1863 conf: February 16, 1864	North Carolina state legislator for four terms.; U.S. Representative, March 4, 1857–March 3, 1859.; 13th North Carolina Infantry: private, April 3, 1861, captain, May 3, 1861, colonel, November 14, 1861.; Wounded at Chancellorsville.; Severely wounded at Gettysburg.
	Scott, Thomas M.	Brigadier general rank: May 10, 1864 nom: May 21, 1864 conf: May 24, 1864	12th Louisiana Infantry, captain, then colonel, August 13, 1861.; Initial brigade command, March 1864.; Severely wounded Franklin, November 30, 1864; no further service.
	Scurry, William Read	Brigadier general rank: September 12, 1862 nom, conf: September 26, 1862	Mexican–American War.; 4th Texas Cavalry Regiment, lieutenant colonel, August 23, 1861.; Fought at Valverde, wounded at Glorieta Pass.; In command at Glorieta because Sibley allegedly under doctor's care, more likely intoxicated.; Killed at Jenkins' Ferry, April 30, 1864.
	Sears, Claudius Wistar	Brigadier general rank: March 1, 1864 nom: March 7, 1864 conf: May 11, 1864	USMA, 1841.; Resigned from U.S. Army as 2nd lieutenant in 1842.; 17th Mississippi Infantry: private, May 1861, captain, July 1861.; 46th Mississippi Infantry: colonel, December 11, 1862.; Captured and paroled at Vicksburg, July 4, 1863.; Exchanged October 1863.; Fought in Atlanta campaign until incapacitated by illness.; Lost leg at Nashville.; Captured near Pulaski, Tennessee a few days after the battle.
	Semmes, Paul Jones	Brigadier general rank, nom: March 11, 1862 conf: March 18, 1862	Cousin of Raphael Semmes.; Captain of Columbus Guards militia company, then Colonel, 1846–1861.; Brigadier general of Georgia Militia, April 25, 1861.; 2nd Georgia Volunteer Infantry Regiment, colonel, May 7, 1861.; Mortally wounded at the Battle of Gettysburg, July 2, 1863, in attack on the Round Tops.; Died during the retreat from Gettysburg, July 10, 1863, Martinsburg, (West) Virginia, aged 48.
	Sharp, Jacob H.	Brigadier general (temporary) rank, nom: July 26, 1864 conf: February 21, 1865	1st Battalion of Mississippi Infantry (44th Mississippi Infantry): private. 1861, captain, February 1862, colonel, August 1863.; Initial brigade command, September 20, 1863.
	Shelby, Joseph Orville	Brigadier general rank: December 15, 1863 nom: January 9, 1864 conf: February 5, 1864	Led pro-slavery Kentuckians in Kansas–Missouri border conflict of the 1850s.; Missouri State Guard, captain, June 1861.; 5th Missouri Cavalry, colonel, June 1862.; Initial brigade command, June 1862.; Appointed major general by E. Kirby Smith, May 10, 1865; unconfirmed.; At end of the war, Shelby and a few men buried battle flag, went to Mexico to fight, could not agree on which side.; Returned to Missouri after fall of Maximilian, 1867.
	Shelley, Charles M.	Brigadier general (temporary) rank: September 17, 1864 nom: September 23, 1864 conf: February 21, 1865	Lieutenant of Talladega Artillery, 1861.; 5th Alabama Infantry, captain, May 11, 1861.; 30th Alabama Infantry: colonel, May 22, 1862.; Captured at Vicksburg.; Upon exchange, joined Army of Tennessee.; Lost 432 men killed and wounded out of 1100 at Franklin.; Shelley's horse was killed under him at Franklin; he had bullet holes in his uniform.
	Shoup, Francis A.	Brigadier general rank: September 12, 1862 nom: September 26, 1862 conf: April 11, 1863	Resigned as 2nd lieutenant, U.S. Army, January 10, 1860, to study law.; Admitted to Indiana bar, 1860.; Captain, Indiana militia.; Moved to Florida (St. Augustine), admitted to Florida bar, 1861.; No apparent reason for adherence to Confederacy other than admiration for Southern men in U.S. Army, recent move to Florida.; Artillery, lieutenant, March 16, 1861; major, November 7, 1861.; Chief of artillery for Hardee at Shiloh, for Hindman at Prairie Grove.; Commanded a Louisiana brigade at Vicksburg.; Captured July 4, 1863, paroled.; Exchanged October 13, 1863.; Chief of artillery to Joseph E. Johnston in Atlanta campaign.; Chief of staff for Hood.
	Sibley, Henry Hopkins	Brigadier general rank, nom: June 17, 1861 conf: August 28, 1861 re-conf: June 10, 1864	USMA, 1838.; Seminole War.; Mexican–American War.; Utah War.; Inventor of the Sibley tent.; Resigned as major, U.S. Army, May 13, 1861.; Colonel, Regular Confederate Army Cavalry, May 16, 1861.; Commanded disastrous Confederate New Mexico Campaign.; Defeated at Glorieta Pass, New Mexico, March 26–28, 1862, where allegedly intoxicated.; Lost many men in retreat to Texas; Union forces destroyed most of his supplies.; E. Kirby Smith twice preferred charges against him.; Alleged alcohol problems.; Without a command at the end of the war.
	Simms, James P.	Brigadier general rank: December 8, 1864 nom: December 13, 1864 conf: February 18, 1865	Brigadier general, Georgia militia.; 2nd lieutenant CSA, 6th Georgia Militia, October 21, 1861.; 42nd Georgia Infantry, 1st lieutenant, April 1862, captain, August 20, 1862.; 53rd Georgia Infantry, major, September 24, 1862, colonel, October 8, 1862.; Wounded at Knoxville.; Initial brigade command, September 30, 1864.; Distinguished at Cedar Creek.; Captured at Sailor's Creek, released July 24, 1865.
	Slack, William Yarney	Colonel; Brigadier general (posthumous) rank, nom: April 12, 1862 conf: April 17, 1862	Mexican–American War.; Brigadier general of Missouri State Guard, July 4, 1861– March 21, 1862.; Severely wounded at Wilson's Creek.; Promoted to brigadier general, CSA, after his death on March 21, 1862, from wounds received at Pea Ridge, March 7, 1862, close to old wound.; Slack was taken to a house within a mile of the battlefield but after a few days was moved to Moore's Mill, seven miles away.; Condition rapidly deteriorated, leading to his death, March 21, 1862, aged 45.; Confederate Senate may not have known of Slack's death at time of confirmation.; Warner, Eicher list as a general.
	Slaughter, James E.	Brigadier general rank: March 8, 1862 nom: March 11, 1862 conf: March 18, 1862	Born in June 1827 on his father's estate, which would become the battlefield of Cedar Mountain or Slaughter's Mountain.; Nephew of President James Madison.; Withdrew from VMI to accept commission in U.S. Army.; Dismissed as 1st lieutenant, U.S. Army, May 14, 1861.; 1st lieutenant, artillery, March 16, 1861.; Captain of artillery with Bragg at Pensacola.; Major, assistant adjutant general, November 6, 1861.; Assistant inspector general with Albert Sidney Johnston, Beauregard and Bragg.; Line command at Mobile.; Chief of artillery for Magruder at Galveston in April 1863; later, Magruder's chief of staff.; Commanded Confederate force at Palmito Ranch, near Brownsville, Texas, the last engagement of the war.
	Smith, Edmund Kirby "Ted", "Seminole"	Brigadier general rank, nom: June 17, 1861 conf: August 28, 1861; Major general rank, nom: October 11, 1861 conf: December 13, 1861; Lieutenant general rank: October 9, 1862 nom: October 10, 1862 conf: October 11, 1862; General (PACS) rank: nom: February 19, 1864 conf: May 11, 1864	USMA, 1845.; Mexican–American War.; Professor of mathematics at West Point.; Wounded in campaigns against Indians, May 13, 1859.; As major of 2nd U.S.Cavalry, refused to surrender Fort Colorado, Texas, to Texas militia under Ben McCulloch.; Resigned as major, U.S. Army on April 6, 1861, when native state of Florida seceded.; Severely wounded at First Bull Run.; Won Battle of Richmond, Kentucky, August 30, 1862.; Command of Trans–Mississippi Department, January 14, 1863–May 26, 1865.; Repulsed Banks's Red River expedition and Steele's associated Camden Expedition.; Almost the last Confederate general to surrender on May 26, 1865.; Fled to Mexico and Cuba but returned November 14, 1865, to take amnesty oath.
	Smith, Gustavus Woodson	Major general rank, nom: September 19, 1861 conf: December 13.: 1861	USMA, 1842.; Mexican–American War.; USMA professor.; Resigned as 1st lieutenant and brevet captain, U.S. Army, December 18, 1854.; Civil engineer.; Street commissioner of New York City, 1858–1861.; Appointed major general without having prior brigadier general appointment.; Commanded a wing of Army of Northern Virginia during Peninsula campaign.; Interim Secretary of War, November 1862.; Resigned in 1863 because of the promotion of junior officers over him.; Volunteer aide to Beauregard.; Superintendent of Etowah Iron Works, 1863–1864.; Major general of Georgia Militia, June 1, 1864–April 20, 1865.; Fought on the Chattahoochee before Battle of Atlanta.; Fought at Savannah; surrendered at Macon, Georgia, April 20, 1865.
	Smith, James Argyle	Brigadier general rank: September 30, 1863 nom: October 1, 1863 conf: February 17, 1864	USMA, 1853.; Resigned as 1st lieutenant, U.S. Army, May 9, 1861.; Captain and assistant adjutant general, Regular Confederate, May 1861.; Major, March 21, 1862, Assistant adjutant general to Leonidas Polk.; 2nd Tennessee Infantry, lieutenant colonel, April 1862.; 5th Confederate Infantry, colonel, September 1862.; Wounded at Chattanooga and Atlanta.; Led Cleburne's division after his death at Franklin.; Led part of remainder of Cheatham's corps in Carolinas campaign.
	Smith, Martin Luther	Brigadier general nom: March 19, 1862 rank, conf: April 11, 1862; Major general rank, nom: November 4, 1862 conf: April 30, 1863	Born in Tompkins County, New York.; USMA, 1842.; Mexican–American War.; Wife from Athens, Georgia.; Resigned as captain, U.S. Army, April 1, 1861.; Major, CSA Corps of Engineers, March 16, 1861.; Engineer, July 22, 1861–April 11, 1862.; 21st Louisiana Infantry: colonel, January 30, 1862.; Planned defenses and commanded troops at New Orleans and Vicksburg.; Captured at Vicksburg.; A paroled prisoner of war for seven months until February 1864.; Chief engineer of Army of Northern Virginia, then Army of Tennessee.; Prepared defenses of Mobile under Beauregard.; Died July 29, 1866, Savannah, Georgia, aged 46.
	Smith, Preston	Brigadier general rank, nom: October 27, 1862 conf: April 22, 1863	Colonel of militia regiment, May 1861, mustered into CSA as 154th Tennessee Volunteer Infantry Regiment; colonel, August 17, 1861.; Initial brigade command March 2, 1862.; Severely wounded at Shiloh.; Commanded brigade at Richmond, Kentucky, then division after Cleburne wounded.; At Battle of Chickamauga, rode in front of Union Army detachment during an attack at dark and was mortally wounded in the chest.; Died September 19, 1863, Chickamauga, Georgia, aged 39.
	Smith, Thomas Benton	Brigadier general (temporary) rank: July 29, 1864 nom: August 2, 1864 conf: February 20, 1865	Nashville Military Institute.; 20th Tennessee Infantry Regiment, 2nd lieutenant.; 20th Tennessee Volunteer Infantry Regiment, colonel, May 1862.; Initial brigade command, August 1, 1862.; Severely wounded at Stones River.; Wounded at Chickamauga.; Captured at Nashville.; After taken prisoner, repeatedly struck with a sword by Colonel William Linn McMillen of 95th Ohio Infantry Regiment.; Brain partly exposed but survived.; Recovered temporarily and worked as a railroad brakeman after war.; Admitted to state asylum at Nashville, Tennessee, in 1876 and died there 47 years later, May 21, 1923, aged 85.
	Smith, William "Extra Billy"	Brigadier general rank: January 31, 1863 nom: February 13, 1863; April 23, 1863; Major general rank: August 12, 1863 nom; August 13, 1863 conf: January 25, 1865	Lawyer, owner of mail coach service, rapidly expanded routes, resulting in extra payments and a nickname.; Five terms in Virginia legislature, five terms as U.S. Representative, one term as governor of Virginia.; As a civilian, took charge of militia company, fought in first land battle of war, the Battle of Fairfax Court House (June 1861), against a Union cavalry company.; 49th Virginia Infantry colonel at First Bull Run.; Representative at First Regular Confederate Congress, attended between campaigns, resigned from Congress in 1863.; Wounded 5 times.; Resigned as brigadier general, July 10, 1863, major general as of August 12, 1863.; Governor of Virginia, inaugurated January 1, 1864, removed and arrested May 9, 1865, paroled June 8, 1865.; Died near Warrenton, Virginia, May 18, 1887, aged 89.
	Smith, William Duncan	Brigadier general rank: March 7, 1862 nom: March 11, 1862 conf: March 13, 1862 re-conf: March 18, 1862	USMA, 1846.; Mexican–American War.; Resigned as captain, U.S. Army, January 28, 1861.; 1st Georgia Regulars, major, 1861.; Assistant adjutant general, defenses of Savannah, June 25, 1861.; 20th Georgia Volunteer Infantry Regiment, colonel, July 14, 1861.; Command of District of South Carolina.; Fought at Secessionville.; Died of yellow fever, October 4, 1862, Charleston, South Carolina, aged 37.
	Sorrel, Gilbert Moxley	Brigadier general rank: October 27, 1864 nom: October 31, 1864 conf: February 20, 1865	Private in militia company.; Took part in capture of Fort Pulaski.; Volunteer aide to Longstreet at First Bull Run and until October 14, 1861.; Captain and assistant adjutant general, September 11, 1861.; Became lieutenant colonel and chief of staff to 1st Corps of Army of Northern Virginia.; Wounded at Antietam, Gettysburg.; With Longstreet in Tennessee.; Detailed to lead troops against Union left at the Wilderness.; Wounded at Petersburg and Hatcher's Run.
	Stafford, Leroy A.	Brigadier general rank, nom: October 8, 1863 conf: January 25, 1864	Mexican–American War.; 9th Louisiana Infantry, lieutenant colonel, April 24, 1861, colonel, April 24, 1862; Warner: October 1861.; Wounded at Antietam.; Captured at Salem Church, Virginia, May 4, 1863.; Exchanged, June 1863.; Assigned to 2nd Louisiana Brigade, Stonewall Division.; Mortally wounded on first day at the Wilderness, May 5, 1864.; Died three days later, aged 42.
	Starke, Peter Burwell	Brigadier general rank: November 4, 1864 nom: November 15, 1864 conf: December 26, 1864	Younger brother of Brigadier General William E. Starke.; Mississippi state legislator, 1850–1854, state senator, 1856–1862.; 28th Mississippi Cavalry, colonel, February 24, 1862.; Fought in defense of Vicksburg.; Detached to Joseph E. Johnston forces.; Initial brigade command, December 23, 1863.; Under Forrest in Franklin–Nashville campaign.; With Chalmers in Mississippi at end of war.
	Starke, William E.	Brigadier general rank, nom: August 6, 1862 conf: September 30, 1862 (posthumous)	53rd Virginia Infantry, lieutenant colonel, June 1861.; Aide to Robert S. Garnett in West Virginia campaign; then to Robert E. Lee.; 60th Virginia Infantry, colonel, October 12, 1861.; Wounded at Glendale.; Initial brigade command, July 26, 1862.; At Second Bull Run, commanded Stonewall Division after Taliaferro wounded.; Command of division at Antietam after J. R. Jones wounded.; Killed at Antietam, September 17, 1862, aged 48.
	Steele, William	Brigadier general rank: September 12, 1862 nom: September 26, 1862 conf: October 3, 1862	Born at Albany, New York.; USMA, 1840.; Mexican–American War.; Married into Texas family.; Resigned as captain, U.S. Army, May 30, 1861.; 7th Texas Cavalry, colonel, October 29, 1861.; Commanded Mesilla area during Sibley's New Mexico campaign.; Command of Indian Territory in 1863.; In charge of Galveston defenses, 1864.; Fought with Taylor in the Red River Campaign.; Distinguished service at Pleasant Hill.; Commanded Thomas Green's division after Green died at Blair's Landing.
	Steuart, George H. "Maryland"	Brigadier general rank: March 6.: 1862 nom: March 11, 1862 conf: March 18, 1862	USMA, 1847.; Routine U.S. Army cavalry service.; Resigned as captain, U.S. Army, April 22, 1861.; Major general, Maryland Militia, 1861.; 1st Maryland Infantry, lieutenant colonel, June 17, 1861, colonel, July 21, 1861.; Seriously wounded at Cross Keys.; Led a brigade at Gettysburg.; Wounded at Payne's Farm, Virginia, November 27, 1864.; Continued in command until most of division captured at the "Mule Shoe" at Spotsylvania Court House, May 12, 1864.; Exchanged, August 3, 1864.; In Pickett's division north of the James River during Siege of Petersburg.; Commanded division in Pickett's absence at Five Forks and in Appomattox Campaign.
	Stevens, Clement H. "Rock"	Brigadier general rank: January 20, 1864 nom: January 28, 1864 conf: February 1, 1864	Son of a U.S. Navy officer.; Constructed the (arguably) first armored fortification at Morris Island.; Severely wounded at First Bull Run while serving as aide to his brother-in law, Barnard Bee.; 24th South Carolina Infantry, colonel, April 1, 1862.; Was in Vicksburg campaign, then transferred to Army of Tennessee.; Severely wounded at Chickamauga.; Fought in Atlanta campaign.; Mortally wounded at Peach Tree Creek, July 20, 1864, died five days later at Atlanta, aged 42.
	Stevens, Walter H.	Brigadier general (special) rank: August 28, 1864 nom: September 2, 1864 conf: January 17, 1865	Born Penn Yan, New York.; USMA, 1848.; Served almost entirely in Louisiana and Texas.; Married a sister of Louis Hebert of Louisiana.; Dismissed as 1st lieutenant, U.S. Army, May 2, 1861.; Major, engineer, at Pensacola, April 1861 and for Beauregard at First Bull Run.; Major, chief engineer of Army of Northern Virginia under Joseph E. Johnston.; Lt. colonel, January 31, 1862, colonel, March 3, 1863.; In charge of Richmond defenses, after Robert E. Lee assumed command.; Again chief engineer of Army of Northern Virginia.; Reported to have been the last uniformed man to cross the Mayo Bridge during the evacuation of Richmond after Five Forks.; Went to Mexico, became chief engineer of Imperial Railroad.; Died of yellow fever, November 12, 1867, Vera Cruz, Mexico, aged 40.
	Stevenson, Carter Littlepage	Brigadier general rank: February 27, 1862 nom: March 5, 1862 conf: March 6, 1862; Major general rank, nom: October 10, 1862 conf: October 13, 1862	USMA, 1838.; Mexican–American War.; Dismissed as captain, U.S. Army, June 25, 1861.; 53rd Virginia Infantry, colonel, July 1861.; Assistant adjutant general, Army of the Northwest, July 21, 1861–March 27, 1862.; Captured at Vicksburg, paroled.; Exchanged October 16, 1863.; At every battle of Army of Tennessee from Chattanooga to Bentonville, except Franklin where division demonstrated against Schofield's force.
	Stewart, Alexander P. "Old Straight"	Brigadier general rank, nom: November 8, 1861 conf: December 13, 1861; Major general rank: June 2, 1863 nom: June 5, 1863 conf: January 25, 1864; Lieutenant general (temporary) rank, nom: June 23, 1864 conf: February 20, 1865	USMA, 1842.; Resigned as 2nd lieutenant, U.S. Army, May 31, 1845, to become a professor at Cumberland University and University of Nashville.; Initially opposed secession.; Major, CSA, Tennessee Militia, May 17, 1861.; Major, CSA Artillery, August 15, 1861.; Wounded at Chickamauga and Ezra Church, Georgia.
	Stovall, Marcellus A.	Brigadier general rank: January 20, 1863 nom: January 23, 1865 conf: April 23, 1863	USMA appointment, 1836, left after one year because of illness.; Seminole War.; Captain, Georgia militia.; Colonel, 2nd Artillery, Georgia Militia, August 1861.; 3rd Georgia Artillery Battalion, lieutenant colonel, October 8, 1861.; In East Tennessee, then with Army of Tennessee.
	Strahl, Otho French	Brigadier general rank, nom: July 28, 1863 conf: January 25, 1864	Born McConnelsville, Ohio.; Lawyer, Dyersburg. Tennessee at start of war.; 4th Tennessee Infantry, captain, May 1861, lieutenant colonel, May 15, 1861, colonel, April 24, 1862.; Initial brigade command June 6, 1863.; Wounded at Atlanta, July 22, 1864.; Killed at Franklin, November 30, 1864, aged 33.
	Stuart, James Ewell Brown "Jeb", "Beauty"	Brigadier general rank, nom: September 24, 1861 conf: December 13, 1861; Major general rank, nom: July 25, 1862 conf: September 27, 1862	USMA, 1854.; Wounded in Kansas, July 29, 1857.; 1st United States Cavalry until Virginia seceded.; Resigned as captain, U.S. Army, May 14, 1861.; Lt. colonel, Provisional Army of Virginia, CSA, May 10, 1861.; 1st Virginia Volunteer Cavalry Regiment, colonel, July 16, 1861.; Fought at First Bull Run, in Seven Days' Battles.; Rode completely around McClellan's army gathering information.; Commanded cavalry corps of the Army of Northern Virginia.; Seized large amount of supplies and documents before Second Bull Run.; Detained Union force at Crampton Gap before Antietam.; Wounded at Upperville, Virginia, November 3, 1862.; At Fredericksburg, and with Stonewall Jackson on flank march at Chancellorsville.; Fought at Battle of Brandy Station.; Controversial ride around Union Army before Gettysburg delayed his arrival until last day of the battle.; Mortally wounded at Yellow Tavern, May 11, 1864.; Died at Richmond the following day, aged 31.; Son-in-law of Union Brigadier General Philip St. George Cooke.; Wife's brother was John Rogers Cooke.

== T ==
Image	Name	Rank	Notes
	Taliaferro, William Booth	Brigadier general rank: March 4, 1862 nom: March 5, 1862 conf: March 6, 1862	Mexican–American War.; State legislator, 1850–1853.; Commanded Virginia militia at time of John Brown's Harpers Ferry raid.; Commanded forces in and around Norfolk, Virginia, April 18, 1861–April 26, 1861.; Major general of Virginia militia, Virginia Provisional Army.; 23rd Virginia Infantry, colonel, May 1, 1861.; Initial brigade command, September 8, 1861.; Severely wounded at Groveton.; Wounded at Fredericksburg.; Paroled at Greensboro, May 2, 1865, as a major general but no record of his promotion to that grade has been found.
	Tappan, James C.	Brigadier general rank, nom: November 5, 1862 conf: April 22, 1863	Arkansas state legislator, 2 terms.; Circuit court judge.; 13th Arkansas Infantry, colonel, July 23, 1861.
	Taylor, Richard	Brigadier general rank, nom: October 21, 1861 conf: December 13, 1861; Major general rank, nom: July 28, 1862 conf: September 27, 1862; Lieutenant general rank: April 8, 1864 nom: May 14, 1864 conf: May 16, 1864	Son of President and General Zachary Taylor.; Brother of Jefferson Davis's first wife.; Mexican–American War; father's military secretary.; State senator, 1856–1861.; 9th Louisiana Infantry, colonel, July 7, 1861.; Initial brigade command, July 1861.; Defeated Nathaniel Banks at Mansfield during Red River Campaign.; Turned Banks back at Pleasant Hill.; After lieutenant general promotion, assigned to Department of Alabama and Mississippi.; Surrendered last Confederate forces east of the Mississippi River in May 1865.
	Taylor, Thomas H.		See Incomplete Appointments section in List of American Civil War generals (Acting Confederate). Warner lists as a general; Eicher does not.
	Terrill, James Barbour	Brigadier general rank, nom, conf: May 31, 1864 posthumous	VMI, 1858.; Major, 13th Virginia Infantry, May 23, 1861, lieutenant colonel, February 26, 1862, colonel, May 15, 1863. Brother of Union Brigadier General William R. Terrill, who was killed at Perryville.; Initial brigade command, May 5, 1864.; Killed at Totopotomoy Creek, Virginia (Bethesda Church) during Overland Campaign, May 30, 1864, aged 26.; Date of brigadier general appointment was June 1, 1864, to rank from May 31, 1864.; Buried by Union soldiers near where he fell.
	Terry, William	Brigadier general rank, nom: May 19, 1864 conf: May 20, 1864	4th Virginia Infantry, lieutenant, April 26, 1861, major April 22, 1862, colonel, September 11, 1863.; Wounded at Second Bull Run.; Wounded at Payne's Farm, Spotsylvania, Winchester.; Severely wounded at Fort Stedman, Virginia, March 25, 1865.
	Terry, William R.	Brigadier general rank: May 31, 1864 nom, conf: June 10, 1864	51st Virginia Cavalry, captain, April 1861.; 24th Virginia Infantry, colonel, September 21, 1861.; Wounded at Williamsburg.; Wounded seven times, including during Pickett's Charge at Gettysburg and at Dinwiddie Court House near Petersburg.
	Thomas, Allen	Brigadier general rank: February 4, 1864 nom: February 11, 1864 conf: February 17, 1864	Colonel of Louisiana militia.; 29th Louisiana Infantry, major, July 1861, colonel, May 3, 1862.; Initial brigade command, December 1862.; Captured, paroled at Vicksburg, exchanged.; Assigned to gather and organize paroled prisoners in the west.; Assigned to his brother-in-law's, Lt. General Richard Taylor's, department.; Commanded division after de Polignac departed for Europe.
	Thomas, Bryan Morel		See incomplete appointments section in List of American Civil War generals (Acting Confederate). Warner lists as a general; Eicher does not.
	Thomas, Edward Lloyd	Brigadier general rank, nom: November 1, 1862 conf: February 17, 1863	Mexican–American War.; 35th Georgia Infantry, colonel, October 15, 1861.; Initial brigade command, May 31, 1862.; Wounded at Mechanicsville.; Fought in every major battle of Army of Northern Virginia, except Antietam.
	Tilghman, Lloyd	Brigadier general rank, nom: October 18, 1861 conf: December 13, 1861	USMA, 1836.; Resigned as 2nd lieutenant, U.S. Army, September 30, 1836.; Mexican–American War.; 3rd Kentucky Infantry, colonel, July 5, 1861.; Surrendered Fort Henry, Tennessee, to U. S. Grant in February 1862.; Prisoner of war until exchanged for John F. Reynolds, August 15, 1862.; Killed at Champion Hill, Mississippi, May 16, 1863, aged 47.
	Toombs, Robert A.	Brigadier general rank, nom: July 19, 1861 conf: August 28, 1861	Lawyer, 1830.; Fought in Creek War, 1836–1837.; Georgia State legislator.; United States Congressman, March 4, 1845–March 3, 1853, and United States Senator, March 4, 1853–February 4, 1861.; Almost chosen Confederate president.; Confederate Secretary of State until July 19, 1861, when appointed brigadier general.; Wounded at Burnside's Bridge at Antietam.; Resigned March 4, 1863.; Vocal critic of Confederate President Jefferson Davis.; Georgia Militia, 3rd Cavalry, colonel, August 4, 1863– February 6, 1864.; Brigadier general, Georgia Militia during Sherman's March to the Sea, February 6, 1864–December 1864.
	Toon, Thomas F.	Brigadier general (temporary) rank: May 31, 1864 nom, conf: June 2, 1864; Reverted to colonel August 1864	20th North Carolina Infantry Private, May 20, 1861, 1st lieutenant, June 17, 1861, captain, July 19, 1861, Major, June 1862, colonel, February 26, 1863.; Led regiment in Jackson's flank attack at Chancellorsville.; Commanded brigade in Valley Campaign of 1864 and at Battle of Monocacy.; Wounded seven times, most severely at Fort Stedman, Virginia, March 25, 1865.; Reverted to rank of colonel when General R. D. Johnston returned to his command of the brigade in August 1864.
	Tracy, Edward D.	Brigadier general rank, nom: August 16, 1862 conf: September 30, 1862	4th Alabama Infantry, captain, January 1861, of a Madison County company.; 19th Alabama Infantry, lieutenant colonel, October 12, 1861.; Initial brigade command, June 29, 1862.; Horse killed under him at Shiloh.; Sent to Vicksburg early in 1863.; Killed at Port Gibson, Mississippi, May 1, 1863, aged 29.
	Trapier, James H.	Brigadier general rank, nom: October 21, 1861 conf: December 13, 1861	USMA, 1838, 3rd in class.; Resigned as 1st lieutenant, U.S. Army, February 28, 1848.; Colonel, aide, South Carolina Militia.; With Beauregard in construction of batteries in Charleston Harbor.; Engineer, April 1861–November 1861.; Major and assistant quartermaster, June 19, 1861.; Assigned to command District of Eastern and Middle Florida.; Commanded a division at Second Corinth.; Criticized by Florida State convention and by Braxton Bragg.; Held inferior posts in South Carolina until end of war.; Died December 21, 1865, Georgetown, South Carolina, aged 50.
	Trimble, Isaac Ridgeway	Brigadier general nom: August 6, 1861 rank, conf: August 9, 1861; Major general rank: January 17, 1863 nom, conf: January 23, 1863	USMA, 1822.; Resigned as 2nd lieutenant, U.S. Army, May 31, 1832, to work in railroad development as construction engineer.; Burned bridges north of Baltimore at the outbreak of the Civil War.; Colonel of engineers in State forces, building defenses of Norfolk, Virginia, May 25, 1861.; Severely wounded at Second Bull Run.; Lost a leg and was captured during Pickett's Charge at Gettysburg, July 3, 1863.; Not exchanged until February 1865 because of knowledge of northern railroads.; Unable to rejoin army before surrender.
	Tucker, William F.	Brigadier general rank: March 1, 1864 nom: March 7, 1864 conf: May 11, 1864	Probate judge.; 11th Mississippi Infantry, captain, May 13, 1861.; Company transferred to 41st Mississippi Infantry, colonel, May 8, 1862.; Wounded at Perryville.; Severely wounded at Resaca, Georgia, May 14, 1864; incapacitated for further field duty.; Commanded District of Southern Mississippi and East Louisiana at end of war.
	Twiggs, David Emanuel "Horse", "Bengal Tiger", "Tiger"	Major general rank, nom: May 22, 1861 conf: August 28, 1861	8th United States Infantry Regiment, captain, March 12, 1812.; War of 1812.; Mexican–American War.; Promoted to brigadier general and brevet major general for Mexican–American War service.; One of the four general officers of the line in the pre–Civil War U.S. Army.; Surrendered U.S. Army forces and military stores in Texas before the beginning of the Civil War.; For this reason was dismissed for treason from the U.S. Army on March 1, 1861.; Assigned to command District of Louisiana, but on October 11, 1861, was retired due to infirmities.
	Tyler, Robert C.	Brigadier general rank: February 23, 1864 nom: March 5, 1864 conf: June 9, 1864	Stated age as 28 when enlisted as private in Company D of 15th Tennessee Infantry, April 18, 1861.; Nothing known about him before his participation in William Walker's 1856 filibuster expedition to Nicaragua.; 15th Tennessee Infantry: quartermaster sergeant, April 18, 1861, major, September 1861, lieutenant colonel, December 26, 1861.; Wounded at Shiloh.; After Second Battle of Corinth, June 1862, elected colonel of regiment.; Bragg's provost marshal during part of Kentucky campaign.; Wounded at Chickamauga.; Wounded and lost a leg at Missionary Ridge.; Did not rejoin Army of Tennessee after brigadier general appointment.; Posted to duty at West Point, Georgia.; With a small group of extra-duty men, militia and detached soldiers, defended Fort Tyler at West Point from forces of James H. Wilson.; Killed by a Union sharpshooter, April 16, 1865, one week after surrender of Robert E. Lee and the Army of Northern Virginia.

== V ==
Image	Name	Rank	Notes
	Vance, Robert Brank	Brigadier general rank: March 4, 1863 nom: March 9, 1863 conf: April 23, 1863	Older brother of North Carolina Governor and U.S. Senator Zebulon Vance.; 29th North Carolina Infantry: colonel, April 24, 1861.; In East Tennessee in defense of Cumberland Gap; in Kentucky Campaign.; Contracted yellow fever.; Initial brigade command, January 1, 1863.; As brigadier general, assigned to duty in western North Carolina.; Captured at Crosby Creek, North Carolina, January 14, 1864.; Special parole for prisoner exchange, 1864.; Exchanged and final parole: March 10, 1865.
	Van Dorn, Earl "Buck"	Brigadier general rank, nom: June 5, 1861 conf: August 28, 1861; Major general rank, nom: September 19, 1861 conf: December 13, 1861	USMA, 1842, 52nd of 56.; Wounded in Mexican–American War. Awarded commendations for gallantry, courage, and meritorious service. Promoted to captain.; Led victoriously as captain defending native settlements from the attacking Comanche Indians, October 1, 1858. Promoted to major.; Resigned as major, U.S. Army, January 31, 1861.; Appointed general and commander of Mississippi's state forces.; 1st Regular Cavalry, colonel, April 11, 1861.; Commander of Confederate Army of the West, April 11, 1861.; First Confederate soldier to force surrender of Union troops by capturing two Union ships, April 17, 1861.; President Abraham Lincoln declared him a pirate under the laws of the U.S. "for seizure of vessels or goods by persons acting under the authority of the Confederate States."; Divisional commander of the Confederate Army of the Potomac, September 19, 1861; Defeated at Pea Ridge due inheriting starving, diseased troops. The situation was later described as an "impossibility" by Confederate President Jefferson Davis.; Transferred to Army of Mississippi at Vicksburg.; Defeated at Second Corinth after apparent victory but mishandling of Union surrender by inexperienced officers.; Relieved by John C. Pemberton Oct. 12, 1862.; Victorious against General Ulysses S. Grant, destroying $1.5 million of supply depots at Holly Springs, Mississippi, saving the south's most important port, December 1862.; Appointed as commander of all cavalry in the Department of Mississippi & East Louisiana, January 13, 1863; Assumed command of all cavalry in Middle Tennessee, headquartered at Spring Hill, TN, February 20, 1863; Victorious in Battle of Thompson's Station, defeating Union forces led by Col. John Coburn, March 1863; Killed by Dr. George B. Peters, May 7, 1863, who alleged Van Dorn "violated the sanctity of his home," in Spring Hill, TN, aged 42.
	Vaughan, Alfred Jefferson Jr.	Brigadier general rank: November 18, 1863 nom: November 21, 1863 conf: February 17, 1864	VMI, 1851.; 13th Tennessee Infantry: captain, May 1861, lieutenant colonel, June 7, 1861, colonel, December 4, 1861.; Wounded at Shiloh.; Wounded, lost leg at Vining Station, Georgia during Atlanta Campaign.
	Vaughn, John C.	Brigadier general rank: September 22, 1862 nom: September 26, 1862 conf: October 3, 1862	Mexican–American War.; 3rd Tennessee Infantry: colonel, May 3, 1861.; Captured at Vicksburg, July 4, 1863.; Exchanged October 13, 1863.; Commanded cavalry brigade during Shenandoah Valley Campaign (1864).; With Jubal Early in march on Washington.; Wounded twice at Martinsburg, West Virginia.; Brigade formed part of Jefferson Davis's escort in flight south after fall of Richmond.; Paroled May 9, 1865, Washington, Georgia.
	Villepigue, John Bordenave	Brigadier general rank: March 13, 1862 nom: March 14, 1862 conf: March 18, 1862	USMA, 1854.: Resigned as 1st lieutenant, U.S. Army, March 31, 1861.; 1st Georgia Infantry Battalion, major, April 16, 1861.; 36th Georgia Infantry: lieutenant colonel, September 1861, colonel, October 29, 1861.; Commanded at Pensacola (wounded), Mobile, Alabama, Fort Pillow on the Mississippi River.; Commanded a brigade under Van Dorn at Second Corinth.; Died of "fever" (pneumonia), Port Hudson, Louisiana, November 9, 1862, aged 32.

== W ==
Image	Name	Rank	Notes
	Walker, Henry Harrison "Mud"	Brigadier general rank, nom: July 1, 1863 conf: February 17, 1864	USMA, 1853.; Served in Kansas.; Resigned as 1st lieutenant, U.S. Army, May 3, 1861.; 40th Virginia Infantry, lieutenant colonel, November 1861.; Twice wounded at Gaines Mill.; Wounded, lost left foot, at Spotsylvania.
	Walker, James Alexander "Bulldog", "Stonewall Jim"	Brigadier general rank: May 15, 1863 nom: May 16, 1863 conf: February 17, 1864	Dismissed from VMI as a senior, 1852; charges by Stonewall Jackson.; Pulaski County, Virginia, militia captain.; 13th Virginia Infantry, lieutenant colonel, May 17, 1861, colonel, February 26, 1862.; Initial brigade command, June 8, 1862.; Wounded at Antietam.; Badly wounded at Spotsylvania.; Railroad defenses in Virginia.
	Walker, John George	Brigadier general nom: December 9, 1861 rank, conf: January 9, 1862; Major general rank:, nom: November 8, 1862 conf: April 22, 1863	U.S. Army commission, 1846.; Wounded in Mexican–American War.; Resigned as captain, U.S. Army, July 31, 1861.; 8th Texas Cavalry: lieutenant colonel, August 1861, colonel, September 1861.; Wounded at Sharpsburg.; Command of a division in District of Texas, New Mexico and Arizona.
	Walker, Leroy Pope	Brigadier general rank:, nom: September 17, 1861 conf: December 13, 1861	State legislator; judge of circuit court.; Brigadier general, Alabama militia.; First Confederate Secretary of War; resigned September 16, 1861.; Garrison command at Mobile, Alabama, and Montgomery, Alabama.; Resigned as brigadier general March 31, 1862.; Presided over military court, April 6, 1864, until end of war as a colonel.
	Walker, Lucius M.	Brigadier general rank:, nom: March 11, 1862 conf: April 11, 1862	USMA, 1850.; Resigned as 2nd lieutenant, U.S. Army, March 31, 1852.; 40th Tennessee Infantry: lieutenant colonel, October 1861; Colonel, November 11, 1861.; Transferred to Trans–Mississippi Department under E. Kirby Smith.; Cavalry brigade command in Price's Helena, Arkansas raid.; Killed in a duel with Brig. Gen. John S. Marmaduke, who questioned Walker's courage, on September 6, 1863, aged 33.
	Walker, Reuben Lindsay "Rube"	Brigadier general rank: February 18, 1865 nom: February 24, 1865 conf: March 1, 1865	VMI, 1845.; Artillery Captain, May 1861; major, March 31, 1862.; Fought in 63 battles.; Lt. colonel, July 3, 1862, colonel, March 14, 1863.; A.P. Hill's chief of artillery.
	Walker, William H.T. "Shot Pouch", "Fighting Billy"	Brigadier general rank, nom: February 9, 1863 conf: March 2, 1863; Major general rank: May 23, 1863 nom: June 27, 1863 conf: January 25, 1864	USMA, 1837.; Wounded in Seminole Wars, Gravely wounded in Mexican–American War.; Commandant of USMA, July 31, 1854–May 22, 1856.; Resigned as major and brevet lieutenant colonel, U.S. Army, December 20, 1860.; Georgia Militia.; Brigadier general in Confederate Army, May 25, 1861.; Resigned October 29, 1861.; Commissioned major general of Georgia state troops.; Recommissioned brigadier general, CSA, February 9, 1863, then major general, May 23, 1863.; In Vicksburg campaign with Joseph E. Johnston.; Commanded Reserve Corps at Chickamauga.; Killed by a picket of Union Army's 16th Corps at Atlanta, July 22, 1864, aged 47.
	Walker, William Stephen "Live Oak"	Brigadier general rank, nom: October 30, 1862 conf: April 22, 1863	Mexican–American War; mustered out August 31, 1848.; Commissioned Captain, 1st U. S. Cavalry Regiment, 1855.; Resigned as captain, U.S. Army, May 1, 1861.; Aide to Robert E. Lee, November 5, 1861–December 1861.; Colonel and acting inspector general of Department of South Carolina and Georgia.; Wounded, captured at Ware Bottom Church, Virginia, May 20, 1864, foot amputated.; Exchanged October 29, 1864.
	Wallace, William Henry	Brigadier general (temporary) rank, nom: September 30, 1864 conf: September 21, 1864	South Carolina state legislator, 1860.; 18th South Carolina Infantry, private, January 1861; lieutenant, January 1862, captain, January 1862, lieutenant colonel, May 5, 1862, Colonel, August 30, 1862.; Wallace succeeded colonel killed at Second Manassas, but not nominated to rank until June 10, 1864.; Fought at the Crater, July 30, 1864, initial brigade command.
	Walthall, Edward Cary	Brigadier general rank: December 12, 1862 nom: December 23, 1862 conf: April 23, 1863; Major general (temporary) rank: June 6, 1864 nom: June 9, 1864 conf: June 10, 1864	15th Mississippi Infantry: 1st lieutenant, April 27, 1861, lieutenant colonel, July 21, 1861.; 29th Mississippi Infantry, colonel, April 11, 1862.; Wounded at "Battle Above the Clouds" at Chattanooga, captured and exchanged.; Wounded at Resaca, Georgia, May 15, 1864.; Two horses killed under him, wounded at Franklin.; Commanded rear guard from Nashville.
	Waterhouse, Richard	Brigadier general rank March 17, 1865 nom, conf: March 18, 1865	Mexican–American War.; 19th Texas Infantry: colonel, May 13, 1862.; In Trans–Mississippi Department at Milliken's Bend, Mansfield, Pleasant Hill.; Assigned to command as brigadier general to date from April 30, 1864, by E. Kirby Smith.; Officially appointed to rank from March 17, 1865, by Jefferson Davis.
	Watie, Stand	Brigadier general rank, nom: May 6, 1864 conf: May 10, 1864	Planter in Georgia, published Cherokee newspaper.; Signed treaty agreeing to removal of Cherokee from Georgia, 1835; split tribe.; Leader of a minority faction of the Cherokees in Oklahoma in allegiance to the Confederacy.; Captain, CSA, April, 1861.; 1st (officially 2nd) Cherokee Mounted Rifles, colonel, July 12, 1861.; Captured various Union Army supply trains, especially at Cabin Creek, Indian Territory, September 19, 1864.; Last Confederate general to surrender, June 23, 1865.
	Waul, Thomas Neville	Brigadier general rank: September 18, 1863 nom: September 19, 1863 conf: June 10, 1864	Elected to Provisional Confederate Congress from Texas, February 19, 1861–February 17, 1862.; Recruited Waul's Texas Legion, colonel, May 17, 1862.; Surrendered at Vicksburg, July 4, 1863.; Exchanged October 16, 1863 (Warner: September 18, 1863).; Fought in Red River campaign and against Camden Expedition.; Wounded at Jenkins' Ferry.; Died July 28, 1903, Hunt County, near Greenville, Texas, aged 90.
	Wayne, Henry C.	Brigadier general rank, nom: December 16, 1861 conf: December 24, 1861	USMA, 1838.; 4th Artillery; transferred to quartermaster department, 1846.; Mexican–American War.; Tested camels as means of army transportation in the southwestern U.S.; Resigned as captain and brevet major, U.S. Army, December 31, 1860.; Adjutant and Inspector General of State of Georgia.; Resigned brigadier general appointment after three weeks; on January 7, 1862, four days after being ordered to Manassas Junction.; On January 11, 1862, returned to former position as adjutant and inspector general of Georgia Militia until end of the war.; Directly in command of Georgia Militia until relieved by G. W. Smith.
	Weisiger, David A.	Brigadier general rank: July 30, 1864 nom: November 1, 1864 conf: February 3, 1865	Mexican–American War.; Officer of the day in Virginia militia at hanging of John Brown in 1859.; 4th Virginia Militia Battalion, major, April 1861.; 12th Virginia Infantry: colonel, May 9, 1861.; Wounded, disabled from Second Manassas to following July.; Along with Mahone, Waul led successful counterattack at the Crater at Petersburg, Virginia, July 30, 1864.; Wounded at the Crater.
	Wharton, Gabriel Colvin "Gabe"	Brigadier general rank: July 8, 1863 nom: September 25, 1863 conf: February 17, 1864	VMI, 1847, 2nd in class.; 45th Virginia Infantry, major, July 1861.; 59th Virginia Infantry, colonel, August 1861.; Escaped with Floyd from Fort Donelson in February 1862, then transferred east.; Command overwhelmed and dispersed at Waynesboro, Virginia, March 1865.
	Wharton, John A.	Brigadier general rank, nom: November 18, 1862 conf: April 22, 1863; Major general rank: November 10, 1863 nom: November 12, 1863 conf: January 25, 1864	Member of Texas secession convention.; Captain in Terry's Texas Rangers, 8th Texas Cavalry, February 1861.; Colonel, November 13, 1861, after deaths of Terry, Lubbock.; Wounded at Shiloh.; Initial brigade command September 27, 1862.; Wounded at Stone's River.; Killed at Houston, Texas by Colonel George W. Baylor, 2nd Texas Cavalry, on April 6, 1865, aged 36.; Baylor stated the unarmed Wharton slapped him and called him a liar.
	Wheeler, Joseph "Little Joe", "Fightin' Joe"	Brigadier general rank, nom: October 30, 1862 conf: April 22, 1863; Major general rank: January 20, 1863 nom: January 23, 1863 conf: February 4, 1864	USMA, 1859.; Resigned as 2nd lieutenant, U.S. Army, April 22, 1861.; 1st lieutenant of artillery.; 19th Alabama Infantry: colonel, September 4, 1861.; Fought at Shiloh.; Chief of cavalry of the Army of Mississippi, July 13, 1862, and the Army of Tennessee.; Initial brigade command, September 14, 1862.; Wounded three times.; In Carolinas Campaign; succeeded by Wade Hampton III as command became increasingly undisciplined.; U.S. Congressman, 1882–1900.; Major general of U.S. Volunteers in the Spanish–American War.; Retired as brigadier general in the U.S. Army.; One of two Confederate generals buried at Arlington National Cemetery.
	Whitfield, John Wilkins	Brigadier general rank, nom: May 9, 1863 conf: January 25, 1864	Mexican–American War.; Congressional delegate from Kansas Territory, 1857.; 27th Texas Cavalry, captain, July 1861, major, September 1861, colonel, March 1, 1862.; Wounded at Iuka.; Commanded a brigade under W. H. Jackson in Mississippi.; Without a command later in the war.
	Whiting, William Henry Chase "Little Billy"	Brigadier general rank, nom: July 21, 1861 conf: August 28, 1861; Major general rank: February 28, 1863 nom: March 5, 1863 conf: April 22, 1863	USMA, 1845.; Highest grades at West Point to that time.; Resigned as captain, U.S. Army, February 20, 1861.; Joined Joseph E. Johnston's Army of the Shenandoah as chief engineer; arranged troop transfer to First Bull Run.; After Malvern Hill, developed Fort Fisher, North Carolina.; Briefly at Siege of Petersburg.; Severely wounded, taken prisoner at Second Fort Fisher, January 15, 1865.; Died of wounds, March 10, 1865, at Fort Columbus, New York Harbor, aged 40.
	Wickham, Williams Carter	Brigadier general rank: September 1, 1863 nom: September 2, 1863 conf: January 25, 1864	Elected to Virginia House of Delegates, 1849, Virginia Senate, 1859.; Virginia Militia.; 4th Virginia Cavalry: captain, April 1861, lieutenant colonel, September 1861, colonel, August 1862.; Captured at Ashland, Virginia, May 29, 1862.; Exchanged for Thomas L. Kane, August 15, 1862.; Wounded at Williamsburg and during Maryland campaign.; Remained with army until fall 1864 despite being elected to Second Regular Confederate Congress after Chancellorsville.; Resigned November 9, 1864, to take seat in Confederate Congress.
	Wigfall, Louis Trezevant	Brigadier general rank, nom: October 21, 1861 conf: December 30, 1861	Seminole War.; Fire-eater Secessionist from 1844.; Served in both houses of Texas legislature.; U.S. Senate, December 5, 1859–withdrew March 23, 1861, expelled July 11, 1861.; Helped defeat Crittenden Compromise.; At Fort Sumter, tried to separately negotiate surrender with Major Anderson.; 1st Texas Infantry, colonel, August 28, 1861.; Commanded Texas Brigade.; Resigned February 20, 1862, to take seat in the Confederate Senate.; Supported Joseph E. Johnston.; Worked to undermine Jefferson Davis.; Responsible for bill making Robert E. Lee General in Chief of all Confederate forces.
	Wilcox, Cadmus Marcellus "Billy Fixin'"	Brigadier general rank, nom: October 21, 1861 conf: December 13, 1861; Major general rank: August 3, 1863 nom. August 13, 1863 conf: January 25, 1864	USMA, 1846.; Mexican–American War.; Resigned as captain, U.S. Army, June 8, 1861.; At all major battles of Army of Northern Virginia from First Manassas.; 9th Alabama Infantry, colonel, July 9, 1861.; Defense of Fort Gregg at Petersburg, Virginia, on April 2, 1865.; Defense allowed the Confederate Army to escape from Petersburg and Richmond.
	Williams, John Stuart "Cerro Gordo"	Brigadier general rank, nom: April 16, 1862 conf: April 18, 1862	Mexican–American War.; Kentucky legislator, 1851–1855.; 5th Kentucky Infantry Regiment, captain, April 1861, lieutenant colonel, September 1861, colonel, August 1862, November 16, 1861.; Commanded Department of East Tennessee in fall 1863.; Helped defeat Union attack on salt works at Saltville, near Abingdon, Virginia.; Later with Wheeler and in southwestern Virginia.
	Wilson, Claudius C.	Brigadier general rank: November 16, 1863 nom: November 18, 1863 conf: February 17, 1864 (posthumous)	Captain, Company I, 25th Georgia Infantry, August 9, 1861, colonel, September 2, 1861.; Served along South Carolina and Georgia coasts.; With Joseph E. Johnston in Vicksburg campaign.; Commanded a brigade at Chickamauga.; Died from camp fever at Ringgold, Georgia, November 27, 1863, aged 32.; Posthumously confirmed as brigadier general by Confederate Senate, February 17, 1864.
	Winder, Charles Sidney	Brigadier general rank: March 1, 1862 nom: March 5, 1862 conf: March 7, 1862	USMA, 1850.; Youngest Captain in U.S. Army at the time, March 3, 1855, for heroism on a troop ship in a hurricane.; Resigned as captain, U.S. Army, April 1, 1861.; 6th South Carolina Infantry: colonel, July 8, 1861.; Led the Stonewall Brigade in Jackson's Valley Campaign of 1862.; Fought in the Seven Days Battles.; Killed at Cedar Mountain, August 9, 1862, aged 32.
	Winder, John H.	Brigadier general rank, nom: June 21, 1861 conf. June 28, 1861 reappointed nom. June 6, 1864 conf: June 10, 1864	USMA, 1820.; Wounded in Mexican–American War.; Resigned as major and brevet lieutenant colonel, 3rd U.S. Artillery, April 27, 1861.; Provost marshal in Richmond, Virginia.; Appointed commissary general of prisoners, November 21, 1864.; Died at Florence, South Carolina, February 7, 1865, aged 64.; Accused by Northern press and public of starving Union prisoners of war; had to deal with food shortages and transport problems.
	Wise, Henry A.	Brigadier general rank: June 5, 1861 nom: June 5, 1861 conf: August 28, 1861 also February 17, 1864	U.S. Representative from Virginia, elected 1833.; Minister to Brazil, 1844–1847.; Governor of Virginia, January 1, 1856–January 1, 1860.; Brother-in-law of Union Army Major General George G. Meade.; Fought in West Virginia campaign, in North Carolina, in defense of Charleston, South Carolina, in Florida, at Drewry's Bluff, in defense of Richmond.
	Withers, Jones M.	Brigadier general rank, nom: July 10, 1861 conf: August 28, 1861; Major general rank: April 6, 1862 nom: August 16, 1862 conf: September 22, 1862	USMA, 1835.; Resigned as brevet 2nd lieutenant, U.S. Army, December 5, 1835, to study law.; Fought in Creek uprising.; Mexican–American War.; Colonel of 9th U.S. Infantry.; Resigned from U.S. Army again after Mexican–American War.; Mayor of Mobile, Alabama, before and after the war.; 3rd Alabama Infantry, Colonel.; Defense of Mobile.; Led 2 brigades at Shiloh.; In August 1863 until end of war in charge of reserve forces in Alabama.
	Wofford, William T.	Brigadier general rank: January 17, 1865 nom: January 23, 1863 conf: April 23, 1863	Mexican–American War.; Georgia state legislator, 1849–1853.; Voted against secession at Georgia convention.; 18th Georgia Infantry: colonel, April 25, 1861.
	Wood, Sterling A.M.	Brigadier general rank: January 7, 1862 nom: January 9, 1862 conf: January 7, 1862	Alabama state legislator, 1857.; Editor of Florence Gazette.; 7th Alabama Infantry, colonel, May 18, 1861.; Badly wounded at Perryville.; Fought at Stones River and Chickamauga under Major General Patrick Cleburne.; Not mentioned in Cleburne's report on Chickamauga but other brigade commanders praised.; Resigned October 17, 1863.
	Wright, Ambrose Ransom "Rans"	Brigadier general rank, nom: June 3, 1862 conf: September 30, 1862; Major general (temporary) rank:, nom: November 26, 1864 conf: November 30, 1864	3rd Georgia Infantry, colonel, May 18, 1861.; Badly wounded at Sharpsburg, September 17, 1862.; Wounded at Chancellorsville.; With Army of Northern Virginia until November 1864.; In command in Georgia until end of war.
	Wright, Marcus Joseph	Brigadier general rank: December 13, 1862 nom: December 20, 1862 conf: April 22, 1863	Militia Colonel.; Militia regiment mustered into Confederate Army as 154th Tennessee Infantry: lieutenant colonel, August 17, 1861.; Military governor of Columbus, Kentucky.; Wounded at Shiloh.; Cheatham's staff at Perryville.; Fought at Chickamauga, Chattanooga.; Commanded posts at Atlanta, Macon and District of North Mississippi and West Tennessee.; Editor, Columbia Tennessee Journal.; Lawyer at Memphis, purser of U.S. Navy yard.; From 1878 through 1917, agent for collection of Confederate records for the War of the Rebellion: Official Records of the Union and Confederate Armies, published by the U.S. government.; Wrote many historical books and magazine articles.; Died December 27, 1922, Washington, D.C., aged 91.; One of two Confederate generals buried in Arlington National Cemetery.

== Y ==
Image	Name	Rank	Notes
	York, Zebulon	Brigadier general (temporary) rank: May 31, 1864 nom: conf: June 2, 1864	14th Louisiana Infantry, captain, April 1861, major, September 2, 1861, lieutenant colonel, February 19, 1862, colonel, October 3, 1862.; Wounded at Williamsburg, Second Manassas.; Lost left arm at Opequon or Third Battle of Winchester, Virginia, September 19, 1864.; Recruited for C.S.A. among foreign born prisoners of war.
	Young, Pierce Manning Butler	Brigadier general rank: September 28, 1863 nom: October 10, 1863 conf: February 17, 1864; Major general (temporary) nom: December 29, 1864 rank: December 30, 1864 conf: January 28, 1865	USMA, resigned before 1861 graduation.; Cobb's legion: 1st lieutenant, July 24, 1861, major, September 3, 1861, lieutenant colonel, November 15, 1861, commander of cavalry.; Distinguished in Wade Hampton III's brigade in Maryland campaign.; Cobb's Legion, colonel, November 1, 1862.; Commanded Hampton's old division for part of 1864.; Wounded four times.; Wounded and captured at Allatoona, Georgia, October 5, 1864; exchanged.; Resisted Sherman's advance on Augusta, Georgia, and then through the Carolinas.
	Young, William Hugh	Brigadier general (temporary) rank: August 15, 1864 nom: August 16, 1864 conf: February 20, 1865	Aide to Edward C. Clark, July 25, 1861.; 9th Texas Infantry: captain, September 1861, colonel, April 1862, after Shiloh.; Wounded at Stones River, Vicksburg campaign, Chickamauga and Kennesaw Mountain in Atlanta campaign (twice).; Wounded, left foot shot off, taken prisoner at Allatoona, Georgia, October 5, 1864, during march into Franklin–Nashville campaign.; Released and paroled July 24, 1865.

== Z ==
Image	Name	Rank	Notes
	Zollicoffer, Felix Kirk "Zollie"	Brigadier general rank:, nom: July 9, 1861 conf: August 28, 1861	Lieutenant of volunteers, Seminole war of 1836.; Adjutant general, state comptroller, Tennessee state senator.; U.S. House of Representatives from Tennessee, March 4, 1853–March 3, 1859; declined to run for fourth term.; Brigadier general, Tennessee Militia, May 9, 1861.; Contrary to Albert Sidney Johnston's instructions, moved forces to Kentucky side of Cumberland River before George B. Crittenden's force arrived.; Crittenden had to attack the approaching Union force with his force against the river.; Zollicoffer killed during ensuing Battle of Mill Springs (or Fishing Creek or Logan's Cross Roads), January 19, 1862, aged 49.

The full text of the following three sections has been moved to List of American Civil War generals (Acting Confederate). The names of the officers in each section are retained under each section here for convenience and reference.

== Assigned to duty by E. Kirby Smith ==
- Bagby, Arthur Pendleton Jr.
- DeBray, Xavier
- Gordon, Benjamin Franklin
- Jackman, Sidney Drake
- King, Wilburn Hill
- Lewis, Levin Major
- Maclay, Robert Plunket
- Randal, Horace
- Terrell, Alexander Watkins

== Incomplete appointments, unconfirmed appointments, refused appointments, posthumous appointments or undelivered commissions ==
- Ashby, Henry Marshall
- Ashby, Turner
- Barry, John D.
- Bartow, Francis Stebbins
- Benton, Samuel
- Bowles, Pinckney Downie
- Brevard Jr., Theodore W.
- Browne, William M., "Constitution"
- Cobb, Thomas Reade Rootes
- Dearing, James
- Deshler, James
- Dunovant, John
- Fauntleroy, Thomas Turner
- Fiser, John Calvin
- Frazer, John W.
- Garrott, Isham Warren
- Girardey, Victor J. B.
- Godwin, Archibald C.
- Goggin, James M.
- Hagan, James
- Hannon, Moses Wright
- Hatton, Robert Hopkins
- Henderson, Robert Johnson
- Hodge, George B.
- Johnson, Adam Rankin "Stovepipe"
- Jones, John R.
- Martin, John D.
- Moore, Samuel Preston
- Munford, Thomas Taylor
- Northrop, Lucius B.
- O'Neal, Edward Asbury
- Pegram, William "Willie"
- Phifer, Charles W.
- Porterfield, George
- Rains, James Edwards
- Robertson, Felix Huston
- Semmes, Raphael, "Beeswax", "Bim" – rear admiral, Confederate States Navy; brigadier general, appointed April 5, 1865 (unconfirmed)
- Taylor, Thomas H.
- Thomas, Bryan Morel
- Walker, Francis Marion

== State militia generals ==
The highest rank attained in the named state militia is shown. The rank in the Confederate Army, if known, is shown.

- Alcorn, James Lusk - brigadier general, Mississippi Militia, the Army of Mississippi
- Anderson, Charles David - brigadier general, Georgia Militia Brigade; received his state militia appointment after his resignation from the CSA in 1864, related to injuries.
- Boggs, James - brigadier general, Virginia militia; he continued his brigade command in the CSA after his forces were incorporated into the Confederate Army
- Ress Bowen - brigadier general, Virginia Militia, he raised his own cavalry detachment at the beginning of the war and was incorporated into the CSA.
- Brogden, Curtis Hooks - major general, North Carolina State militia
- Carson, James Harvey - brigadier general, Virginia militia
- Carswell, Reuben Walker - brigadier general, Georgia militia
- Chapman, Augustus A. - brigadier general, Virginia militia
- Chase, William Henry - major general, Florida militia
- Clark, Edward - brigadier general, Texas
- Clark, John Bullock - brigadier general, Missouri State Guard
- Clark, Meriwether Lewis Sr. - brigadier general, Missouri State Guard; rose to rank of colonel in the Confederate States Army
- Davis, Jefferson - major general, Mississippi Militia; thereafter Elected President and Commander in Chief of the Confederate States
- de Saussure, Wilmot Gibbes - brigadier general, South Carolina militia; subsequently elected adjutant general and inspector general of the S.C. militia
- Ford, John Salmon "R.I.P." "Rip" - senior captain, Texas state troops; Captain Texas Rangers; served at rank of colonel in the Confederate Army
- Garlington, Albert Creswell - major general, South Carolina militia, after serving as brigadier general of the US Army prior to 1860;
- Harman, William Henry - brigadier general, Virginia militia, assistant adjutant general, Confederate Army
- Harper, Kenton - major general, Virginia Militia; brigadier general, Virginia Provisional Army, and colonel once the VPA was joined to the Confederate Army
- Harris, Jeptha Vining - brigadier general of state troops in Mississippi, later returned to serve as colonel within Mississippi (CSA rank status uncertain)
- Harrison, Sr., George Paul - brigadier general, George militia, served at rank of colonel in the Confederate Army
- McBride, James Haggin - brigadier general, Missouri State Guard
- McCay, Henry Kent - Georgia militia - served at rank of colonel in the Confederate Army
- Meem, Gilbert Simrall - brigadier general, Virginia militia
- Philips, Pleasant J. - brigadier general, Georgia Militia
- Pratt, John G. – brigadier general, Louisiana militia
- Rains, George W. - brigadier general, George militia, served at rank of colonel in the Confederate Army
- Smith, Francis Henney - Major general, Virginia militia; served at rank of colonel in the Confederate Army
- Thompson, Meriwether Jefferson, "Jeff", "Swamp Fox" - brigadier general, Missouri State Guard
- Watkins, Nathaniel W. - brigadier general, Missouri State Guard

== See also ==
- General officers in the Confederate States Army
- General officers in the United States
- List of American Civil War generals
- List of American Civil War generals (Acting Confederate)
- List of American Civil War generals (Union)
- List of American Civil War brevet generals (Union)
- Bibliography of the American Civil War
