= Thomas Harrison (general) =

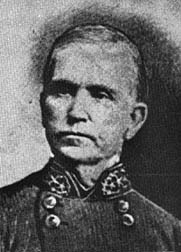
- Brig. Gen. Thomas Harrison
- Born: May 1, 1823; Jefferson County, Alabama
- Died: July 14, 1891 (aged 68); Waco, Texas
- Burial place: Waco, Texas
- Military career
- Allegiance: United States of America; Confederate States of America
- Branch: United States Volunteers; Confederate States Army
- Service years: 1861–1865 (CSA)
- Rank: Private, USA; Brigadier General, CSA
- Unit: Mississippi Rifles
- Commands: 8th Texas Cavalry Regiment; Harrison's Cavalry Brigade
- Conflicts: Mexican–American War; American Civil War

Thomas Harrison (May 1, 1823 – July 14, 1891) was a Confederate States Army brigadier general during the American Civil War. He had a law practice in Waco, Texas, after moving to Texas in 1843. He was a Mexican–American War veteran and Texas state legislator before the war. After the war, he was a district judge at Waco and was a Democratic Party politician and Presidential elector.

== Early life ==
Thomas Harrison was born on May 1, 1823, in Jefferson County, Alabama. He was raised in Monroe County, Mississippi. Thomas Harrison moved to Brazoria County, Texas, in 1843 and studied law, establishing a law practice at Waco. He returned to Mississippi in order to become a member of the 1st Mississippi Rifles, commanded by future Confederate President Jefferson Davis during the Mexican–American War.

Harrison served a term in the Texas legislature from Harris County. He then settled in Waco, Texas. He was the captain of a volunteer militia company and served for a time in West Texas.

== Family ==
Thomas Harrison was the son of Isham Harrison (November 4, 1788 Greenville County, South Carolina – September 30, 1863) and Harriet Kelly (February 11, 1789 – July 1, 1856 Aberdeen, Mississippi). He was a brother of Confederate Brigadier General James E. Harrison. Thomas married Sarah Elizabeth McDonald in 1858. Their restored Greek Revival home still stands but has been moved the Pape Gardens in Waco and is available for guided tours. Thomas Harrison died July 14, 1891, at Waco, Texas and is buried in Oakwood Cemetery at Waco.

== American Civil War ==
After service in West Texas, Harrison's militia company joined the 8th Texas Cavalry Regiment of the Confederate States Army, which was known as "Terry's Texas Rangers," after a measles epidemic caused a large reduction in the number of men in the regiment. Harrison began his service as captain and was promoted to major in early 1862. He fought with the regiment at the Battle of Shiloh, Siege of Corinth and Battle of Perryville. Harrison became colonel of the regiment on November 18, 1862, about six weeks before the Battle of Stones River (Murfreesboro, Tennessee) and led the regiment at that battle. Harrison was wounded in the hip on January 1, 1863, at Stones River. He subsequently led the regiment during the Tullahoma Campaign.

Between July 1863 and April 26, 1865, Harrison commanded cavalry brigades in the divisions of Brigadier General John A. Wharton (including Major General William T. Martin's detachment), Brigadier General Frank Crawford Armstrong and Brigadier General William Y.C. Humes in Major General Joseph Wheeler's Cavalry Corps of the Army of Tennessee and the Department of South Carolina, Georgia and Florida. His regiment and brigade often were used as scouts.

Harrison fought under the command of Cavalry Corps commander Major General Joseph Wheeler at the Battle of Chickamauga and in the Knoxville Campaign, Atlanta campaign, Savannah Campaign (Sherman's March to the Sea) and the Carolinas campaign.

Despite being in brigade command for a considerable period of time, Harrison was not appointed as a brigadier general until near the end of the war, February 18, 1865, to rank from January 14, 1865. His brigade was placed in Brigadier General Robert H. Anderson's division in Lieutenant General Wade Hampton's (his second cousin) cavalry corps during the Carolinas Campaign. Harrison was wounded at the Battle of Monroe's Crossroads in North Carolina on March 10, 1865. He was paroled at Macon, Georgia, on May 31, 1865, and pardoned on March 29, 1866.

== Aftermath ==
Harrison returned to Waco after the end of the war. He was elected district judge. He became an anti-Reconstruction Democrat. He was a Democratic Party Presidential Elector in 1872.

== See also ==
- List of American Civil War generals (Confederate)
