= Benjamin Franklin Terry =

Confederate army officer (1821–1861)

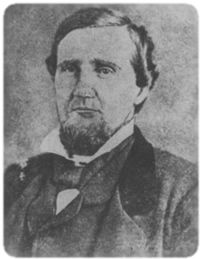
- Born: February 18, 1821; Russellville, Kentucky
- Died: December 17, 1861 (aged 40); Woodsonville, Kentucky
- Burial place: Houston, Texas
- Relatives: Col. David S. Terry (brother)
- Military career
- Allegiance: Confederate States of America
- Branch: Confederate States Army
- Service years: 1861
- Rank: Colonel
- Commands: Confederate States of America 8th Texas Cavalry
- Conflicts: American Civil War: Battle of Rowlett's Station †

Benjamin Franklin Terry (February 18, 1821 – December 17, 1861) raised and commanded the 8th Texas Cavalry Regiment, popularly known as Terry's Texas Rangers, during the American Civil War. A slave owner, planter and prominent citizen of Fort Bend County, he organized the regiment for the Confederate States Army. Terry was killed in the regiment's first action at Rowlett's Station near Woodsonville, Kentucky.

== Family ==
Born on February 18, 1821, in Russellville, Kentucky, the son of Joseph R. and Sarah David (Smith) Terry. His grandfathers, Nathaniel Terry and David Smith, had been officers in the American Revolutionary War, and the latter also served under Andrew Jackson in the War of 1812.

Terry's family moved to Brazoria County, Texas when he was a boy. In 1851–53, using slave labor, Terry participated in the building of Texas's first railroad, the Buffalo Bayou, Brazos, and Colorado Railway.

With his business partner William F. Kyle, Terry bought the 2,500-acre Oakland plantation for $25 (~$742.00 in 2024) per acre in 1853. Paying off the debt by 1858, he used slaves to farm cotton and sugar cane at the plantation in Sugar Land, Fort Bend County, Texas. In 1860, Terry and his 38-year-old wife Mary had six children. In 1862, his brother Clinton joined the Confederate Army and was killed at the Battle of Shiloh. His son Kyle later was involved in the Jaybird-Woodpecker War and was shot to death in the Galveston courthouse in 1890.

== Career ==
By reason of his wealth, large physical size, and popularity, Frank Terry became a leader in Fort Bend County. On January 9, 1861, he was elected a delegate to the Secession Convention in Austin where Texas formally drafted their rationale to secede from the Union.

He, along with the Delegation, helped draft the following clauses in the Texas Secession Articles of 1861:

--"(Texas) was received into the confederacy with her own constitution, under the guarantee of the federal constitution and the compact of annexation, that she should enjoy these blessings. She was received as a commonwealth holding, maintaining and protecting the institution known as negro slavery--the servitude of the African to the white race within her limits--a relation that had existed from the first settlement of her wilderness by the white race, and which her people intended should exist in all future time."

--"We hold as undeniable truths that the governments of the various States, and of the confederacy itself, were established exclusively by the white race, for themselves and their posterity; that the African race had no agency in their establishment; that they were rightfully held and regarded as an inferior and dependent race, and in that condition only could their existence in this country be rendered beneficial or tolerable."

--"That in this free government all white men are and of right ought to be entitled to equal civil and political rights; that the servitude of the African race, as existing in these States, is mutually beneficial to both bond and free, and is abundantly authorized and justified by the experience of mankind, and the revealed will of the Almighty Creator, as recognized by all Christian nations; while the destruction of the existing relations between the two races, as advocated by our sectional enemies, would bring inevitable calamities upon both and desolation upon the fifteen slave-holding States."

Terry and two fellow delegates, Thomas S. Lubbock and John A. Wharton, conceived the idea of organizing at least one company of Texas cavalrymen for the new government.

In February and March 1861 Terry was one of the senior officers aiding John Salmon Ford and Ebenezar B. Nichols in the campaign to disarm the federal troops at Brazos Santiago. In June 1861 Terry, Lubbock, Wharton, and perhaps as many as fifty other Texans sailed from Galveston to New Orleans and then caught the train to Richmond to offer their services to the Confederate Army. In Richmond Terry and Lubbock secured positions as volunteer aides to General James Longstreet. Both men were appointed colonel, a term attached as a courtesy for their volunteer service, and participated with distinction in the First Battle of Bull Run.

Afterward, the Confederate States War Department granted the authority to organize a cavalry regiment. At Houston on August 12, 1861, Terry and Lubbock issued a call for volunteers that was answered by 1,170 men. The rangers were sworn into service in September, but Terry delayed their final organization until late November, when they were officially designated the Eighth Texas Cavalry. The regiment started immediately for Virginia but en route was diverted to Nashville, Tennessee and then later ordered to Bowling Green, Kentucky.

On December 17, 1861, Terry was killed at the head of his regiment at the Battle of Rowlett's Station. His remains were sent by train to Nashville, where the state legislature adjourned and joined the procession escorting his body to lay in state at the Tennessee Capitol. Terry's body also lay in state in New Orleans and Houston, where the procession was described as "the most imposing ever seen in this state."

== Tributes ==
Terry County, Texas, is named after him, as is B. F. Terry High School in Rosenberg, Texas.
