= Thomas Saltus Lubbock =

Texas ranger (1817–1862)

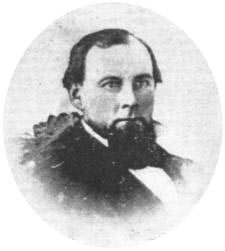
- Born: November 29, 1817; Charleston, South Carolina
- Died: January 9, 1862 (aged 44); Bowling Green, Kentucky
- Burial place: Glenwood Cemetery (Houston, Texas)
- Spouse: Sarah Obedience Smith Lubbock
- Military career
- Allegiance: Confederate States of America
- Branch: Confederate States Army
- Service years: 1861–1862
- Rank: Colonel
- Commands: Eighth Texas Cavalry
- Conflicts: American Civil War

Thomas Saltus Lubbock (November 29, 1817 – January 9, 1862) was a figure in Texas and the Confederacy. Born in South Carolina, he relocated to Texas and became a Texas Ranger, fighting in the Texas Revolution. Lubbock later served as a lieutenant in the failed Texan Santa Fe Expedition. During the Civil War, he rose to the rank of colonel in the Confederate Army and commanded Terry's Texas Rangers for a brief period before his death in 1862. Lubbock County, Texas, and the city of Lubbock are named in his honor.

== Biography ==
Lubbock was born in Charleston, South Carolina, son of Henry Thomas William Lubbock and Susan Ann (née Saltus). His brother was Governor of Texas Francis R. Lubbock. In 1835, he moved to Louisiana and worked as a cotton factor in New Orleans. When the Texas Revolution started, he marched to Nacogdoches, Texas, with Capt. William G. Cooke's company and participated in the siege of San Antonio de Bexar. Thereafter, he took employment on the sidewheel steamboat Yellowstone on the upper Brazos River. Lubbock was aboard during Yellowstone's transfer of troops across the Brazos River.

After working for a time with Samuel May Williams and Thomas F. McKinney, Lubbock joined the Texan Santa Fe Expedition as a lieutenant of one of the military companies. His men and he were captured in New Mexico and confined in Santiago Convent, Mexico City. Lubbock escaped by jumping from the convent's balcony and made his way back to Texas via the breakaway Republic of Yucatan and the Texas Navy, which was operating in Yucatan waters. After Adrián Woll seized San Antonio in 1842, Lubbock was elected first lieutenant of Gardiner N. O. Smith's company, and due to Smith's illness, marched at the head of the company to Bexar to join in driving the Mexicans back across the Rio Grande. Lubbock and his men were among the Texans who followed Alexander Somervell back to Texas on December 19, 1842, after declining to join William S. Fisher on the Mier Expedition.

Lubbock was a strong secessionist, characterized as a "very worthy and zealous" Knight of the Golden Circle. At the beginning of the American Civil War, he accompanied Benjamin Franklin Terry, John A. Wharton, Thomas J. Goree, and James Longstreet (who was to become the commander of I Corps of Robert E. Lee's Army of Northern Virginia) from Galveston, Texas, to Richmond, Virginia.

At the Confederate capital on June 22 or June 23, 1861, Terry and he, seconded by Senator Louis T. Wigfall, Thomas Neville Waul, Wharton, and Longstreet, petitioned Confederate President Jefferson Davis for "authority to raise a company or battalion of guerrillas." "I must have your men," Davis reportedly replied.

While in Virginia, Lubbock, Terry, and some 15 other Texans organized themselves into an independent band of rangers to scout for the Confederate Army. Early in July, Lubbock and Terry, at the head of a company of Virginia cavalry, charged a Union camp, captured two of the enemy, wounded a third, and captured a horse and a Sharps rifle. Only then did they realize that they were alone and that the Virginians had not followed them in their rash attack.

Lubbock was still a civilian in Virginia at the time of the battle of First Bull Run; he "exposed his life in bearing messages during the contest." With Terry, who had also served as a volunteer aide on the battlefield, Lubbock was authorized to raise a regiment of cavalry to serve in the Confederate States Army. The two men returned to Texas and recruited the Eighth Texas Cavalry, more commonly known as "Terry's Texas Rangers". Terry served as the regimental colonel and Lubbock as lieutenant colonel. In poor health, Lubbock left the regiment at Nashville, Tennessee, and never returned to it.

== Personal life ==
Lubbock was married on December 14, 1843, to Sara Anna Smith.

== Death and legacy ==
Colonel Terry was killed at the Battle of Rowlett's Station (also known as the Battle of Woodsonville), in Kentucky on December 17, 1861. On January 8, 1862, Lubbock, then sick in bed in a Bowling Green hospital with typhoid fever, was promoted to colonel and advanced to command of the regiment. He died the next day. Thomas Saltus Lubbock is buried in Glenwood Cemetery (Houston, Texas). The city of Lubbock located in western Texas, and the county of which it is the seat, are named after Tom S. Lubbock. Terry County Texas is named after Terry's Texas Rangers.
