= Cyrus S. Oberly =

American journalist

Cyrus S. Oberly (ca. 1840–1888) was an American journalist based in Texas. He served in the Confederate Army.

== Early life ==
Oberly was born in Ohio in 1839 or 1840 and lived in Memphis, Tennessee, and Cairo, Illinois, before coming to Houston, Texas, in 1859 or 1860. He had a younger brother, John H. Oberly.

== Career ==
Oberly began his newspaper career on the Houston Telegraph.

At the beginning of the U.S. Civil War, Oberly was one of the first men in Harris County, Texas, to volunteer for service. He joined Ford's Texas Regiment and served with it until he enlisted in Terry's Texas Rangers. He was at the Battle of Woodsonville, Kentucky, and at Shiloh. He was then made a lieutenant.

Postwar, he returned to Texas, where he worked for the Galveston News, "off and on for some years." In 1876, he took over the editorship of the Cairo (Illinois) Bulletin from his brother, John. In 1877 he was "the accomplished Texas correspondent" of the Chicago Times.

He moved to Houston, where he was employed as foreman in the printing office of J.J. Pastoriza, but went back to Galveston in 1884 as correspondent of the Houston Post. He next took the position of Houston correspondent for The Galveston News.

In 1883, Oberly was a member of the Southern Historical Society.

== Death ==
He died suddenly of "rheumatism or paralysis of the heart" on February 1, 1888.

A funeral service was held at Shearn Memorial Church in Galveston, but the weather being so disagreeable, the funeral cortege was composed of streetcars because "the fearful condition of the streets" made it "impossible to get a hearse and carriages to the cemetery." The local newspaper called it "a novel sight indeed" as they moved through the rain to the cemetery.
