= Terry's Texas Rangers =

Confederate States military unit

8th Texas Cavalry
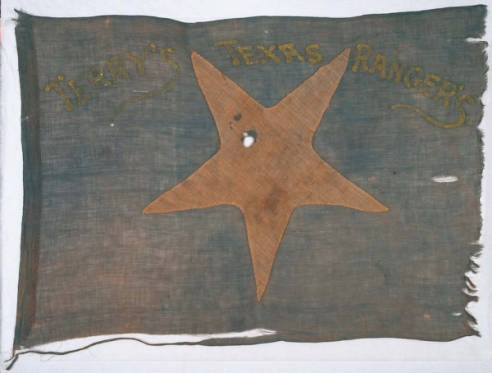
- Active: August, 1861 – April 26, 1865
- Country: Confederate States of America
- Allegiance: Confederate States of America, Texas
- Branch: Confederate States Army
- Type: Light cavalry
- Role: Cavalry tactics Charge; Maneuver warfare Patrolling; Raiding; Reconnaissance; Screening; Shock tactics
- Size: regiment (1,787 men)
- Nickname: Terry's Texas Rangers
- Engagements: American Civil War; Battle of Shiloh; First Battle of Murfreesboro; Battle of Perryville; Second Battle of Murfreesboro; Battle of Fort Pillow; Battles of Chattanooga; Battle of Chickamauga

Commanders
- Notable commanders: Col. Benjamin Terry; Gen. John Wharton; Gen. Thomas Harrison

The 8th Texas Cavalry Regiment (1861–1865), popularly known as Terry's Texas Rangers, was a light cavalry regiment of Texas volunteers for the Confederate States Army assembled by Colonel Benjamin Franklin Terry in August 1861. Although lesser known than the Texas Brigade's actions during the Battle of Gettysburg, the 8th Texas Cavalry distinguished itself in several battles during the American Civil War. Over four years of service, Terry's Texas Rangers fought in approximately 275 engagements across seven states. The regiment earned a reputation as one of the most effective mounted units in the Western Theater of the American Civil War.

== Organization, loss of commanders ==
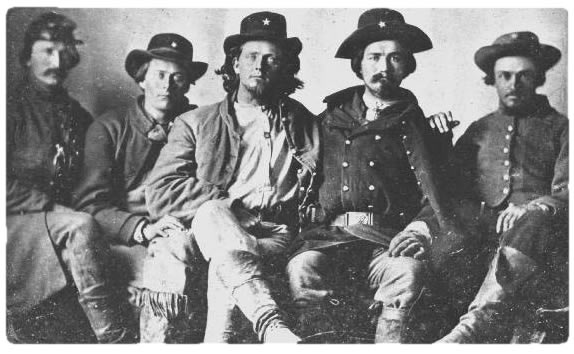
A group of Terry's Texas Rangers, Company "C", from left to right, Walter S. Wood, Thomas S. Burney, Anthony D. Schumaker, William A. Lynch, and Peter L. Kendall, circa 1863

Following Texas's secession and entry into the Confederacy, Benjamin Franklin Terry, a wealthy slave owner and sugar planter, recruited and organized the regiment in August 1861 in Houston, Texas. Initially intended for service in Virginia, the regiment was instead placed under the command of Confederate General Albert Sydney Johnston for service west of the Mississippi. They first saw combat in a skirmish on December 17, 1861, near Woodsonville, Kentucky, where they engaged the Union and were supported by the 6th Arkansas Infantry. Colonel Terry was killed in action during this skirmish. Lieutenant Colonel Thomas Lubbock succeeded him as colonel but died of disease before taking command. John A. Wharton was then made colonel and held the position until his promotion to brigadier general. Wharton was succeeded by Thomas Harrison.

== Major battles and shock troops ==
Terry's Texas Rangers Monument at the Texas State Capitol: The inscription includes a quote by Jefferson Davis: "The Terry Rangers have done all that could be expected or required of soldiers."

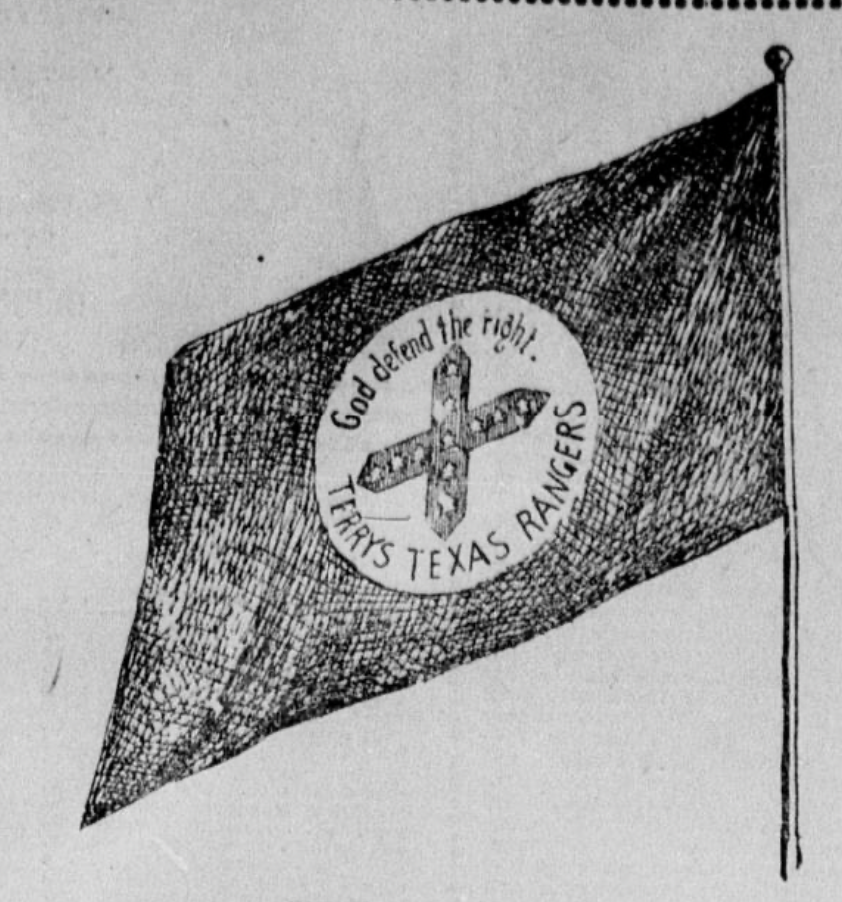
Other Regimental flag

As part of the Army of Tennessee led by General Braxton Bragg, the Texans' riding and shooting skills often led to their use as shock troops. Their first major action was at the Battle of Shiloh, where they distinguished themselves. They also supported Nathan Bedford Forrest's cavalry during the Battle of Murfreesboro. Afterward, they were sent behind enemy lines to harass the enemy and disrupt their lines of communication. They were engaged in all three phases of the Battles of Chattanooga, the Battle of Chickamauga, the Knoxville Campaign, and the Atlanta campaign.

The Rangers' ability to harass the enemy was frequently utilized against William Tecumseh Sherman. By July 1864, Sherman's army had reached Atlanta. On July 30, Terry's Texas Rangers met the troops of Union Col. E. M. McCook and defeated them. They then attempted to destroy railway lines, though with little lasting effect. Following the loss of Atlanta, the regiment harassed the flanks of Sherman's force as it marched through Georgia, although by then the Confederacy lacked the strength to stop him. Their last engagement was at the Battle of Bentonville, where they made their final charge, losing three officers: Gustave Cook, who had been the regimental colonel since Harrison's promotion, Lieutenant Colonel Christian, and Major Jarmon. Declining to surrender with the rest of the Army of Tennessee on April 26, 1865, the Rangers made their way south in an effort to link up with other Confederates who had yet to surrender. Ultimately, they returned to Texas in small groups without formally surrendering. On May 1, 1865, the regiment led a raid on a Confederate commissary and quartermaster in Washington, Georgia.

== List of documented soldiers ==
- Ephraim Shelby Dodd
- George Harrison Grosvenor May
- John Goodwin Haynie
- Thomas McKinney Jack
- Oswald Tilghman
- William Andrew Fletcher
- Silas Henry Vanschoubroek
- Cyrus S. Oberly
- George Morse Collinsworth Jr.

== See also ==
- Texas Civil War Confederate Units
