= Southern Historical Society =

American revisionist historical archive

The Southern Historical Society
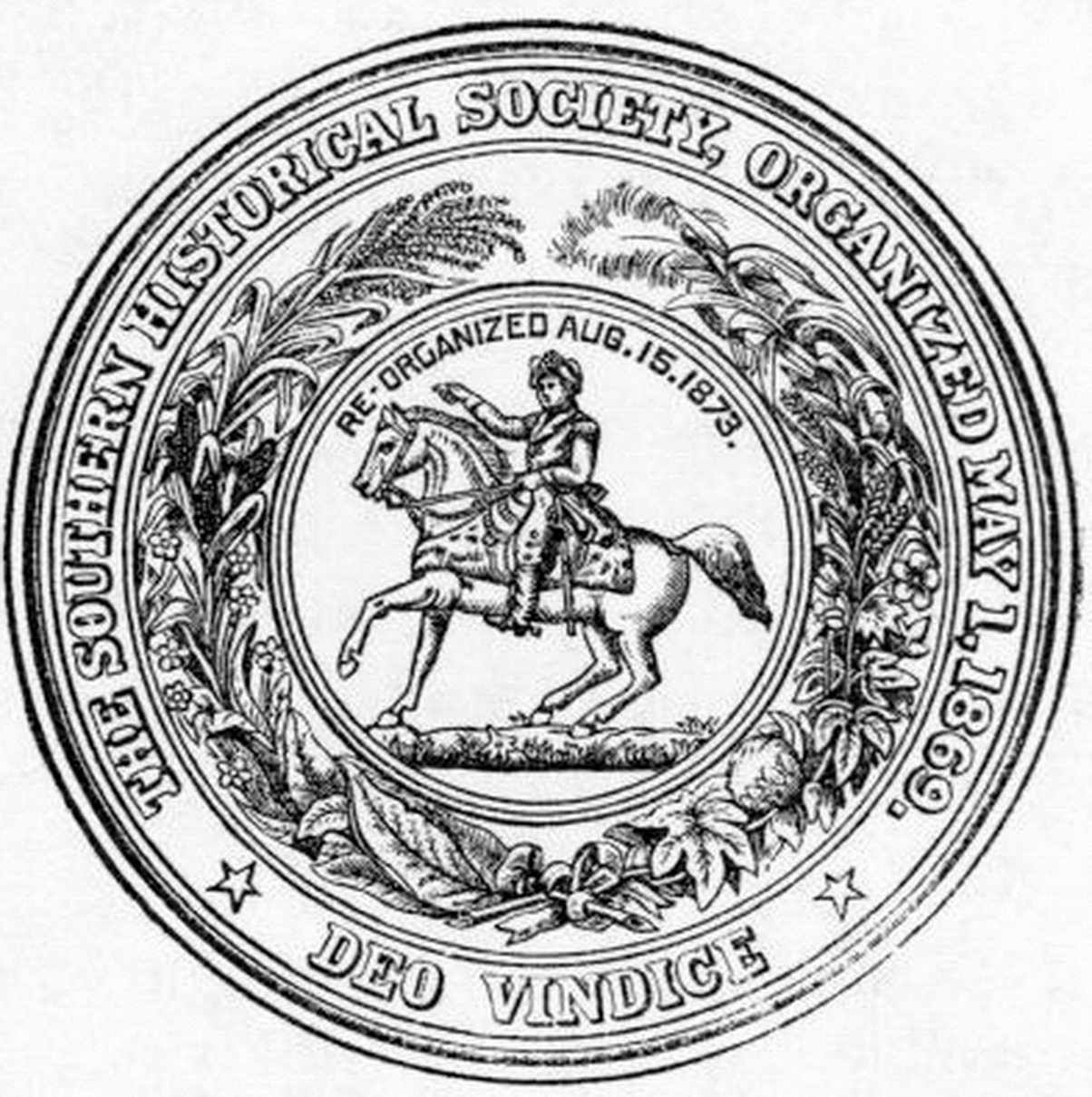
- Seal of the Southern Historical Society
- Formation: April 15, 1869
- Founder: Dabney H. Maury
- Founded at: New Orleans
- Dissolved: 1959
- Headquarters: Richmond, Virginia
- Products: Southern Historical Society Papers

The Southern Historical Society was an American organization founded to preserve archival materials related to the government of the Confederate States of America and to document the history of the American Civil War. The society was organized on May 1, 1869, in New Orleans, Louisiana. It published 52 volumes of its Southern Historical Society Papers which helped preserve valuable historical resources.

== History ==
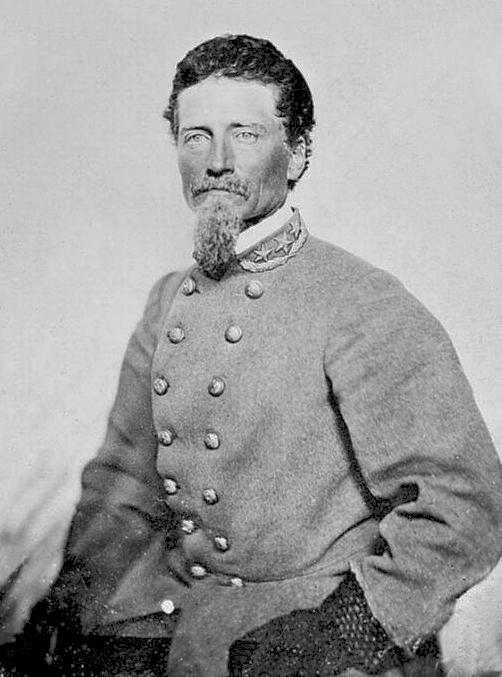
Dabney H. Maury

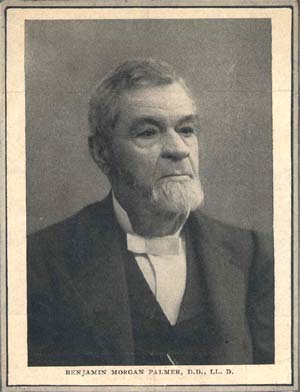
Benjamin Morgan Palmer

Dabney H. Maury founded the Southern Historical Society on April 15, 1869, in New Orleans. Maury and the eight other founding members donated family papers, books, and artifacts to the society to form its initial collection. Its first publication began in 1876 and continued until 1959. The society was officially organized on May 1, 1869; signatories included Braxton Bragg, J. E. Austin, Dabney H. Maury, B. M. Harrod, Simon Bolivar Buckner, S. H. Buck, A. L. Stuart, George Norton, and C. L. C. Dupuy.

As initially organized, the society had a president and secretary-treasurer, which were paid positions. Prominent individuals from each of the former Confederate states, plus the border states of Maryland, Kentucky, and the District of Columbia, were appointed as state vice–presidents to help expand the society throughout the Southern United States and to gather material relating to their areas. The first officers were Benjamin Morgan Palmer, president; Braxton Bragg, vice–president for Louisiana; Robert E. Lee, vice–president for Virginia; John C. Breckinridge, vice–president for Kentucky; and Alexander H. Stephens, vice–president for Georgia.

The society's objective was "to collect reliable data of the workings of the late Confederate Government, and the battles, sieges, and exploits of the war." Other targeted Confederate materials for the archive included newspapers, speeches, literary and medical journals, journals, maps, agricultural and manufacturing reports, geological reports, weather reports, sermons, poetry, songs and ballads, mining operation records, and foreign relations. The society also wanted to document the names and details of wounded soldiers, mortality records, and exchanges of prisoners of war. In addition, records of enslaved people and documentation of the impact of emancipation on the Slave states and free states. Once collected, the archival materials were to be classified and preserved, with an outlook for eventual publication. Preservation was to be achieved by securing a fireproof storage building.

The society's president, Benjamin Morgan Palmer, wrote in July 1873:

It is due to the noble men who fell martyrs to the "Lost Cause" that a faithful history of the events of the four years of bloody war be truthfully recorded, and an impartial view of the motives that actuated them be handed down to posterity with the seal of an impartial and unbiased history… The country has been flooded with partisan histories, in many of which the pretended historian has wandered as far from truth as if he had been writing a work of fiction, and in all of these every incident favorable to the Southern character has been suppressed, and the plainest facts so warped that the actors themselves would not recognize them. It is high time steps were taken to record the events of those years as they occurred….

With the assistance of these state vice–presidents, 6,000 copies of the circular were distributed throughout the southern United States. Newspapers and magazines reprinted the circular in both southern and northern states. However, membership was mostly limited to New Orleans, and there were only 44 dues-paying members at the start of the society's second year.

In 1870, its president was B. M. Palmer. When Palmer turned down reelection as president, he was replaced by Braxton Bragg. Dabney H. Maury was vice–president and J. William Jones became the secretary-treasurer. When Jones' health declined, James Strawbridge was elected secretary-treasurer. However, Strawbridge resigned at a meeting on December 12, 1870. The society did not meet again until July 10, 1871, with just ten members present. Palmer presided over the meeting and was reelected president and P. G. T. Beauregard as vice–president. John W. Caldwell was elected secretary-treasurer with an annual salary of $500.

The society held a reorganizational convention on August 14, 1873, at White Sulphur Springs, West Virginia The convention opened with a speech by Jubal Early. Representatives attended from Alabama, Georgia, Kentucky, Louisiana, Mississippi, Missouri, North Carolina, South Carolina, Tennessee, Texas, and Virginia. The society moved its offices and archives from New Orleans to Richmond, Virginia.

On August 25, 1873, a letter from a writer in Charlottesville, Virginia to the editor of The New York Times said:

The meeting of the Southern Historical Society might seem like a harmless affair. Its ostensible object is to make a defense in history of "the Lost Cause." The spirits in this movement are mainly the military chieftains of the rebellion. …As a mere nursery of military vanity, and a desperate effort to write the Confederacy and its leaders into some measure of posthumous fame, it might be permitted to pass with a sneer at its folly. But I am constrained to believe that its real purposes are hidden, and are by no means so innocent as they appear.

== Seal ==
In October 1888, the executive committee adopted a seal for the society, adapted from the great or broad seal of the Confederate States of America by Robert A. Brock; the seal was engraved, pro bono, by Mr. M. S. O'Donnell of Malden, Massachusetts. The circular seal has the motto: "The Southern Historical Society, Organized May 1, 1869; Deo Vindice". Its central device is a man on a horse, with the text "Re–organized Aug.15.1873" surrounded by a wreath of assorted plants.

== Publications ==
In 1869, the society started publishing editorials and reports in The New Orleans Picayune and The Land We Love, a literary and agricultural magazine published by former Confederate general Daniel Harvey Hill. By 1874, Southern Magazine took over Hill's publication, and included twenty pages in each issue from the society. Eventually, the society began publishing a journal, the Southern Historical Society Papers.

Starting in January 1876, the Southern Historical Society Papers eventually comprised 52 volumes of articles written by former Confederate soldiers, officers, politicians, and civilians. Contributors included Jefferson Davis, Jubal Early, John B. Gordon, Daniel Harvey Hill, John Bell Hood, J. William Jones, Alexander H. Stephens, Robert M. T. Hunter, William Henry Fitzhugh Lee, and Zebulon Baird Vance. The first fourteen volumes were edited by Rev. J. William Jones, who also published Personal Reminiscences, Anecdotes, and Letters of Gen. Robert E. Lee in 1875. The Papers had a nationwide circulation and was published through 1959.

Historian Richard D. Starnes has noted that the society was uninterested in historical accuracy and objectivity and "dedicated itself to the creation of a Confederate historical memory" and "to preserving the Confederate perspective of the Civil War". He added, "Sometimes, the documents were altered as part of the society's campaign to construct a Southern historical memory and in an effort to protect its own leadership."

== Legacy ==
According to modern historians, the organization's purpose was to promote the Lost Cause in its publications. Historian Alan T. Nolan quotes from the advertisement for subscriptions to the organization's publication, and comments, "Writing whose purpose is to 'vindicate' the 'name and fame' of the South's 'great struggle' plainly proceeds from an advocacy premise". Historian Gaines Foster said it was an "avowedly" historical organization, which "eventually became important in the Confederate tradition" and, through their publications, a group of Virginian pro-Confederacy writers "refought the war,".

The society established itself at Richmond, Virginia, which became the home of the American Civil War Museum. It influenced the Sons of Confederate Veterans and activists in favor of public display of the Confederate battle flag. Historians use the society's journal as a source for Civil War research and an example of how historical memory can be shaped to serve external goals. One modern historian notes, "For historians today, the Southern Papers serve as a storehouse of information concerning the Confederacy. Second, only to the War of the Rebellion records, the Papers represent the largest collection of battle accounts, unit rosters, and other primary material about the southern armies during the Civil War."

== Notable members and contributors ==
- Alexander Hunter (novelist)
- Edward Porter Alexander
- Robert H. Anderson
- Bishop James Atkins
- P. G. T. Beauregard
- Braxton Bragg
- John C. Breckinridge
- Joseph E. Brown
- Simon Bolivar Buckner
- Matthew C. Butler
- John W. Caldwell
- Alexander William Campbell
- George Llewellyn Christian
- Charles Magill Conrad
- William Wilson Corcoran
- Jabez Lamar Monroe Curry
- Jefferson Davis
- Jubal A. Early
- Charles Erasmus Fenner
- Charles W. Field
- Augustus Hill Garland
- Randall L. Gilbson
- Jeremy Francis Gilmer
- John B. Gordon
- Wade Hampton
- Isham G. Harris
- Harry T. Hays
- Paul Octave Hébert
- Henry Heth
- Daniel Harvey Hill
- John Bell Hood
- William Y. C. Humes
- Benjamin G. Humphreys
- Robert M. T. Hunter
- Eppa Hunton
- William Preston Johnston
- J. William Jones
- James Henry Lane
- Alexander Lawton
- Fitzhugh Lee
- Robert E. Lee
- William Henry Fitzhugh Lee
- John Letcher
- Robert D. Lilley
- George Washington Logan
- Armistead Lindsay Long
- Stephen Mallory
- John S. Marmaduke
- William T. Martin
- Henry M. Matthews
- Dabney H. Maury
- Joseph C. Mayo
- Thomas T. Munford
- Cyrus S. Oberly
- Henry W. Ogden
- James Phelan
- Trusten Polk
- Beverly Robertson
- Raphael Semmes
- Thomas Jenkins Semmes
- Ashbel Smith
- Alexander H. Stephens
- James Strawbridge
- Walter H. Taylor
- William Terry
- Robert Toombs
- Isaac R. Trimble
- Zebulon Baird Vance
- Charles S. Venable
- Severn Teackle Wallis
- Gabriel C. Wharton
- Cadmus M. Wilcox
- Robert E. Withers
