= William Andrew Fletcher =

Texas born Confederate soldier and author

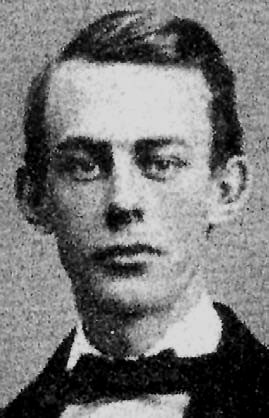
- William Fletcher before the Civil War
- Born: 23 April 1839; St. Landry Parish, Louisiana
- Died: 5 January 1915 (aged 75); Beaumont, Jefferson County, Texas
- Spouse: Julia Long
- Children: Emmett Alverson Fletcher (1867–1943), Harvey Davis Fletcher (1869–1920), Marion Keith Fletcher (1872–1938), and Vallie B. Fletcher (1874–1959)
- Relatives: Thomas Fletcher (father), Eliza Miller (mother)
- Military career
- Allegiance: Confederate States of America
- Branch: Confederate Army
- Rank: Sergeant
- Nickname: Bill Fletcher
- Conflicts: American Civil War; Battle of Gaines' Mill; Battle of Seven Pines; Second Battle of Bull Run; Battle of Gettysburg (WIA); Battle of Chickamauga (WIA); Battle of Bentonville
- Other work: Rebel private, front and rear; experiences and observations from the early fifties and through the Civil War (1908)

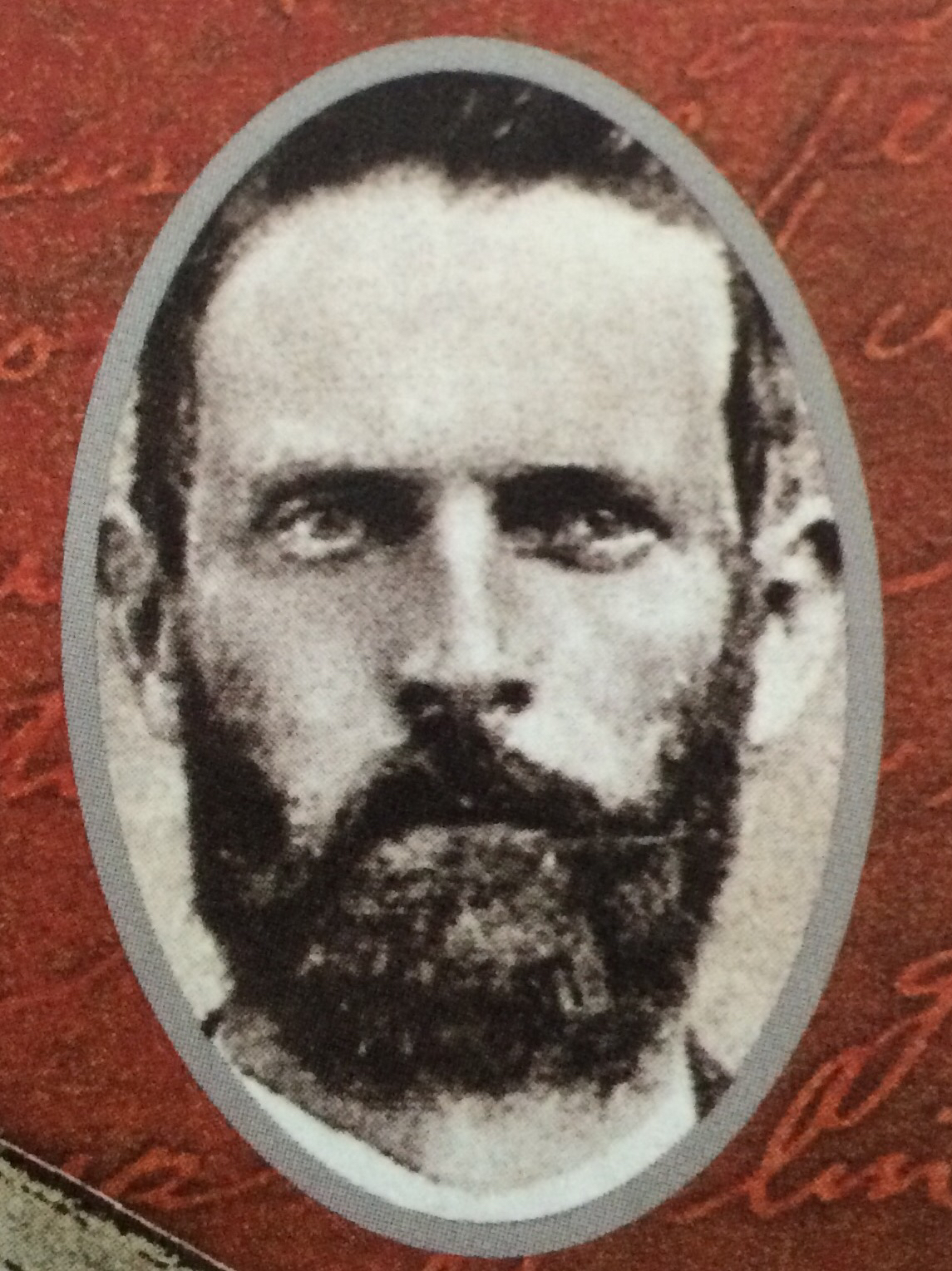
William During the Civil War.

William Andrew Fletcher (April 23, 1839 – January 5, 1915) was an author, veteran of the American Civil War, and lumber tycoon.

== Early life ==
William was born in 1839 to Thomas Fletcher (1807-after 1865) and Eliza Miller (1814-before 1849), Thomas worked as a carpenter and slave driver or overseer in Texas but left in 1836 due to the Texas Revolution and moved east to Louisiana where he met Eliza and they had William 3 years later. Thomas told his son in the 1850s that he suspected that slavery would eventually be abolished and that a war would surely begin over the issue which was an unpopular opinion. Thomas wanted to move somewhere that had a smaller population of African-Americans and decided to move to Wiess Bluff in 1856. However they moved to Beaumont in 1859 at the insistence of a friend of Thomas known only as Simon.

== Military life ==
In 1861, while William was putting shingles on a two story house, a man named Captain William Rogers arrived and told him of the Battle of Fort Sumter and the start of the American Civil War. Williams enlisted into the Confederate Army and was sent to Richmond, Virginia where he was assigned to the Company F, Fifth Texas Regiment, Hood's Texas Brigade. During his time in Richmond he befriended a fruit merchant nicknamed "Wild Bill" and contracted both measles and the mumps, he was also injured when he slipped on ice while roaming the country. William and his fellow men were then sent to a small camp near the Potomac River in 1862 but soon made their way to Fredericksburg where William had a severe case of Jaundice and temporarily stayed in a hotel until he recovered and was sent to Yorktown; he was placed under the command of General John B. Magruder. William got into a brief small skirmish with Union troops but survived unscathed and a couple weeks later William and his company fought in the Battle of Gaines' Mill and later the Battle of Seven Pines where he met President Jefferson Davis. After the battles, William and his men rode a train to Stanton and marched across "hard road country" which resulted in a private named A.N. Vaughn, developing a severe blister on his heel. The men were then under placed under the command of Stonewall Jackson during the Second Battle of Bull Run, where William achieved temporarily the rank of colonel and was wounded. In 1863 William recovered and fought in under James Longstreet in Gettysburg and was wounded again at the Battle of Chickamauga and was discharged. In 1864 he reenlisted and was sent to Company E of the Eighth Texas Cavalry; William was briefly captured by Union forces in Murfreesboro, Tennessee but was able to escape and fought under Joseph E. Johnston in Bentonville, North Carolina.

== Post-War Life ==
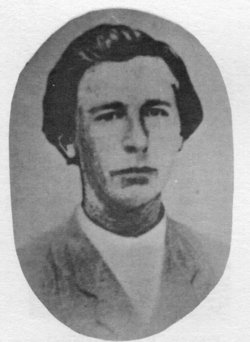
James Long

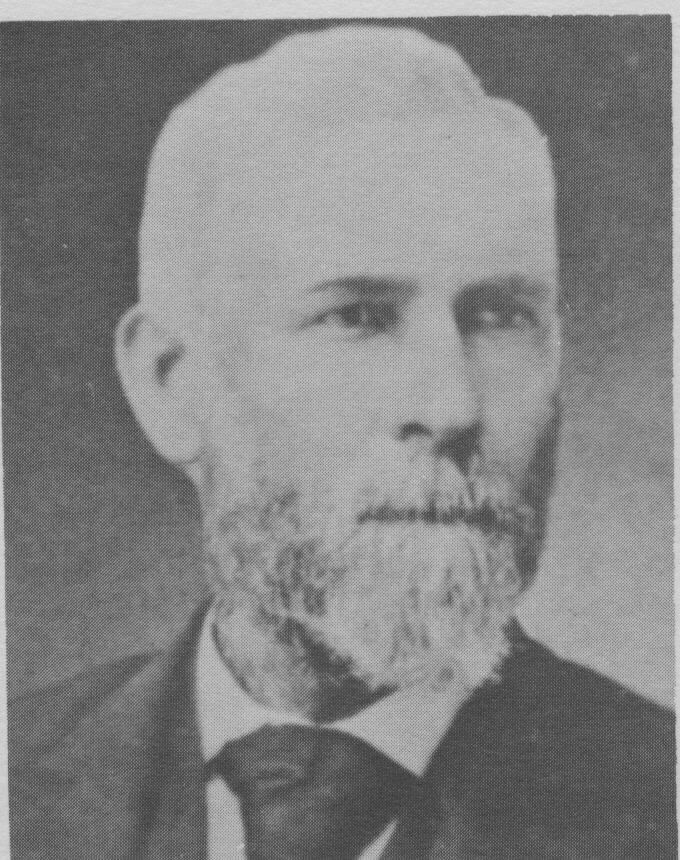
William Fletcher circa 1910

After the war he returned to Texas and reunited with his father and step-siblings and learned of the deaths of both his brother, Benjamin, and step mother due to a yellow fever outbreak. William started a general repair shop and married Julia Long of Georgia (1846–1918) in 1869 and had 5 children with her and began to work and eventually entered a partnership with Julia's brother and fellow veteran, James Monroe Long (1836–1873). In 1901 William sold part of his business to John Henry Kirby and retired to his farm with 1,000 arches of timber in Orange County. Throughout the 1910s He invented a steam log skidder to load timber, was a director of the Keith Lumber Company and the Neches Iron works and promoted highways and canals in the region.

=== Writings ===
In 1908, William wrote his autobiography. Rebel Private, front and rear; Experiences and Observations from the Early Fifties and Through the Civil War, the original copy of the book was destroyed in a fire in 1924, but it has been reprinted by the University of Texas Press since 1955.

=== Descendants ===
==== Emmett Alverson Fletcher ====
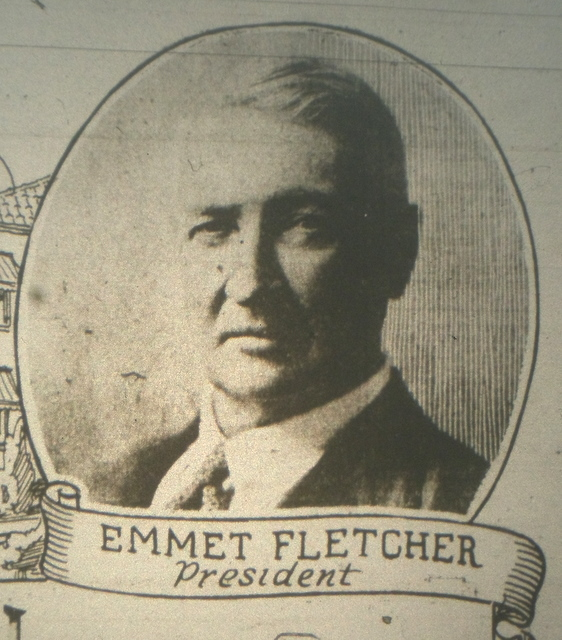
Emmett Alverson Fletcher

The William's eldest son, Emmett (10 October 1867 – 24 February 1943) became the President of the Romayor Gravel Company, a Texas ranger and a real estate agent and mayor of Beaumont.

==== Harvey Davis Fletcher ====
Harvey (20 August 1869 – 3 January 1920) was a newspaper man in the Service Department of The Beaumont Enterprise and became the treasurer of a lumber company in Beaumont in 1900.

==== Marion K. Fletcher ====
Marion (1871–1938) led a rather mysterious life, not much is publicly known about Marion other than that around 1896 he married Katherine Ligon (1874–1956) and had 3 children together.

==== Vallie Fletcher ====
Vallie (1874–1959) also led a quiet life, she lived in Houston for the majority of her adult life and never married.
