= Dabney H. Maury =

American diplomat (1822–1900)

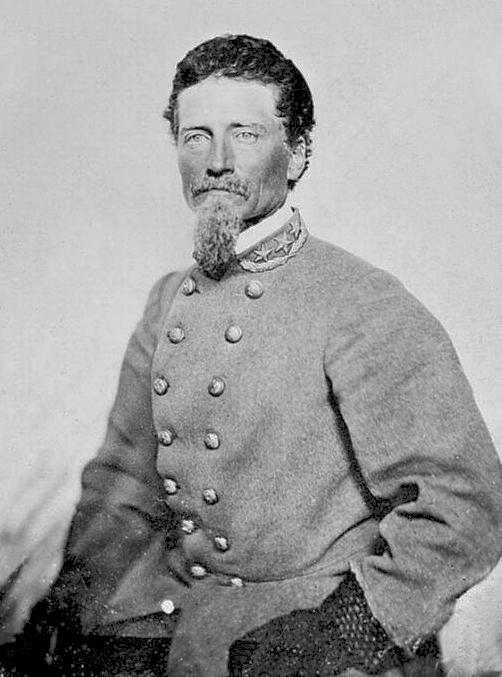
- Maury in uniform, c. 1862
- Born: Dabney Herndon Maury; May 21, 1822; Fredericksburg, Virginia, U.S.
- Died: January 11, 1900 (aged 77); Peoria, Illinois, U.S.
- Military career
- Allegiance: United States; Confederate States
- Branch: United States Army; Confederate States Army
- Service years: 1846–1861 (USA); 1861–1865 (CSA)
- Rank: First Lieutenant (USA); Major General (CSA)
- Unit: 3d United States Cavalry
- Conflicts: Indian Wars; Mexican–American War; American Civil War

Dabney Herndon Maury (May 21, 1822 – January 11, 1900) was an officer in the United States Army, instructor at West Point, author of military training books, and a major general in the Confederate States Army during the American Civil War.

== Early life ==
Dabney Herndon Maury was born in Fredericksburg, Virginia. His descent is from the old Virginia families of Brooke and Minor, and the Huguenot emigrees, the Fontaines and Maurys. Dabney was the son of Naval Lieutenant John Minor Maury, who died of yellow fever in the West Indies when Dabney was two years old. He was brought up by his uncle, Matthew Fontaine Maury, who is noted as "Father of Modern Oceanography and Naval Meteorology". He studied law in Fredericksburg and graduated from the University of Virginia in the class of 1841 and then finished his studies at the United States Military Academy in 1846 and was brevetted as a second lieutenant in the Regiment of Mounted Rifles.

Maury served in the Mexican–American War at the Battle of Cerro Gordo, and suffered a painful wound that almost resulted in the amputation of his arm. He was soon sent home to recuperate and was brevetted to first lieutenant for bravery. His gallantry in this event prompted the citizens of Fredericksburg and the Legislature of Virginia to honor him with a special presentation sword. After further convalescence in White Sulphur Springs, he was reassigned to West Point as an instructor, serving in that capacity from 1847 until 1852. He married Nannie Rose Mason on 10 March 1852 in Stafford County, Virginia.

Maury then returned to active field duty with the Mounted Rifles, serving in the Oregon Territory, then on the Texas frontier. He returned East and commanded the Cavalry School at the Carlisle Barracks in 1858. He authored a book, Tactics for Mounted Rifles, which became the standard textbook. He also wrote Recollections of a Virginian in the Indian, Mexican, and the Civil Wars.

== American Civil War ==
When the Civil War began, Maury was the Assistant Adjutant General in the New Mexico Territory, based in Santa Fe. Hearing the news of the firing on Fort Sumter, he resigned from the United States Army and travelled back to Virginia. He entered the Confederate Army as a colonel, serving as an Adjutant General, then was Chief of Staff under General Earl Van Dorn.

Following the Battle of Pea Ridge, he was promoted to the rank of brigadier general and assigned to field command. Maury led a division at the Second Battle of Corinth, and was appointed major general in November 1862. He participated in army operations around Vicksburg, Mississippi, and in the defense of Mobile, Alabama. In the latter military campaign, Maury commanded the Department of the Gulf.

== Later life ==
With the conclusion of the Civil War, Maury came home to Virginia and established an academy in Fredericksburg to teach classical literature and mathematics. He moved to New Orleans, where a business venture failed and he returned to Virginia. In 1868, he organized the Southern Historical Society, based in Richmond.

Maury spent 20 years working for the Southern Historical Society that produced 52 volumes of Southern history and genealogies. Two years after his wife died, Maury began a movement in 1878 to reorganize the National Militia. He authored a treatise entitled Skirmish Drill for Mounted Troops in 1886.

Maury, appointed by President Cleveland, served as Minister to Colombia from 1887 to 1889. General Maury died at the home of his son (Dabney Herndon Maury Jr.) in Peoria, Illinois, and his remains were interred in the Confederate portion of the city cemetery in Fredericksburg, Virginia.

Maury's flag as commander of the Department of the Gulf, 1864

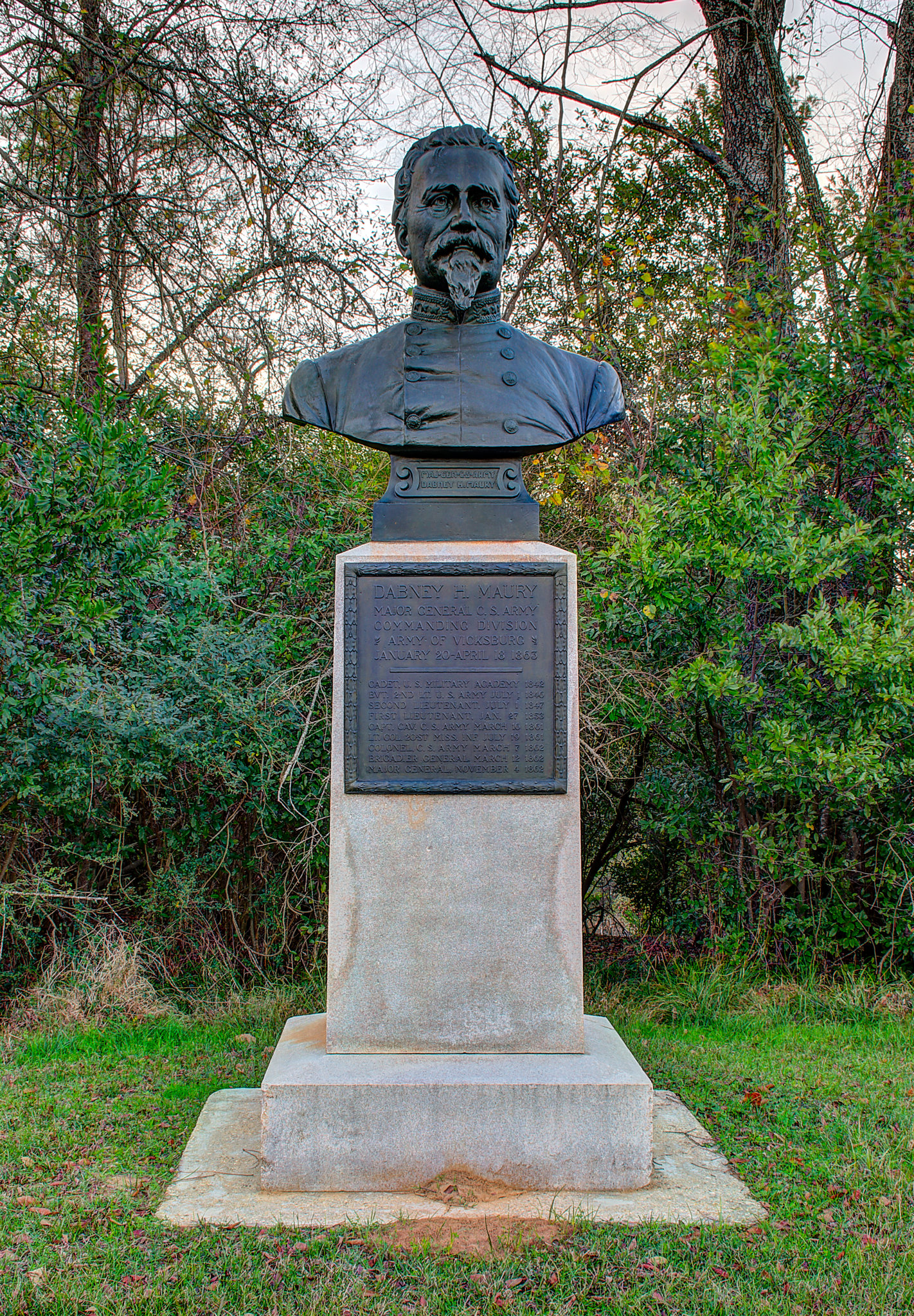
Bust of Maury by George Brewster at Vicksburg National Military Park

== See also ==
- List of American Civil War generals (Confederate)

Diplomatic posts
Preceded by Charles D. Jacob	United States Minister to Colombia; January 20, 1887 – June 22, 1889	Succeeded by John T. Abbott
