= Fort Early and Jubal Early Monument =

- U.S. National Register of Historic Places
- Virginia Landmarks Register
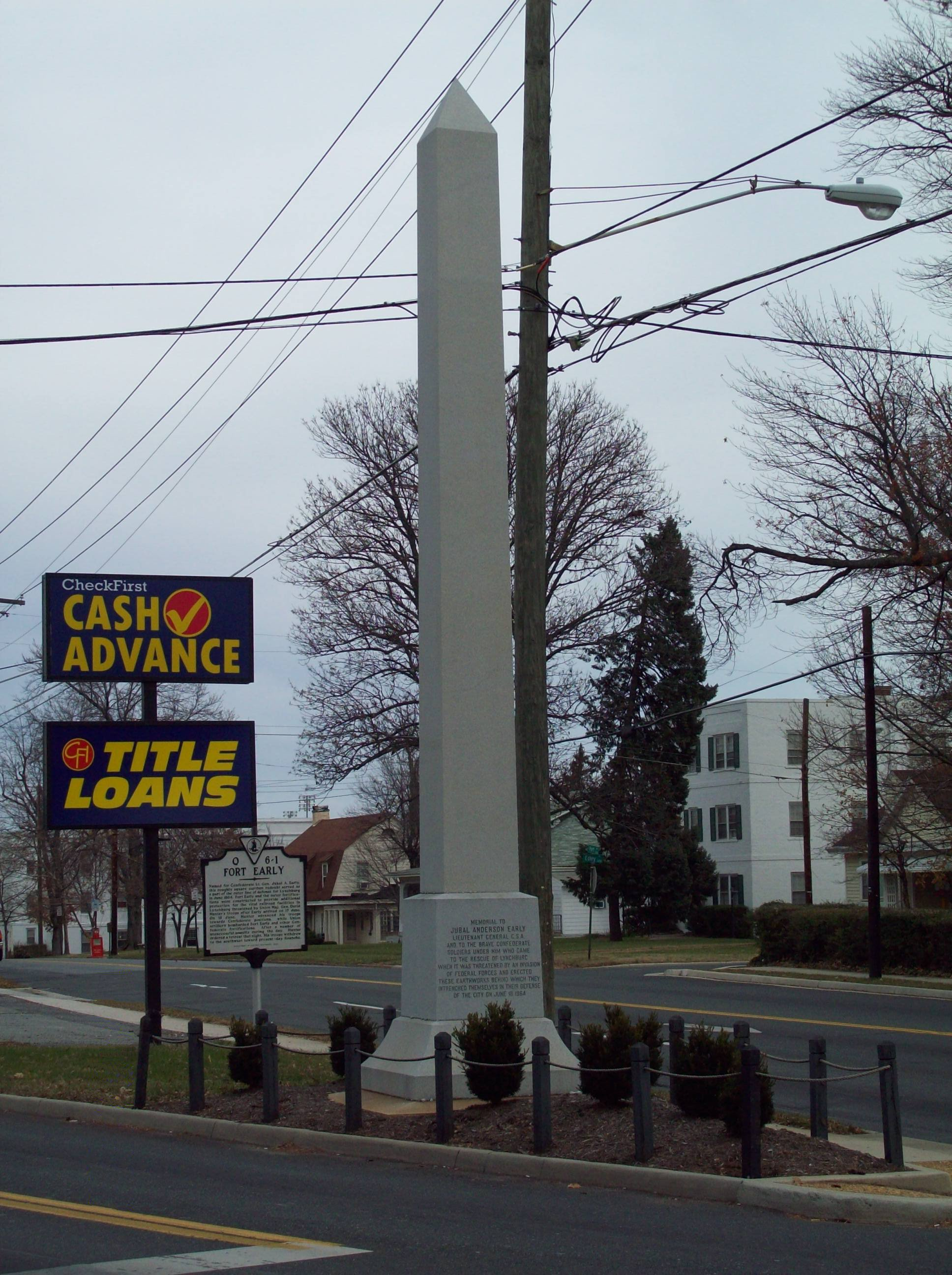
- Jubal Early Monument, Lynchburg VA, November 2008

- Location within Virginia Location within the United States
- Location: 3511 Memorial Ave., Lynchburg, Virginia
- Coordinates: 37°23′23″N 79°10′24″W
- Area: 1.3 acres (0.53 ha)
- Built: 1864
- Architectural style: Classical Revival
- NRHP reference No.: 01001517
- VLR No.: 118-5162

Significant dates
- Added to NRHP: January 24, 2002
- Designated VLR: June 13, 2001

The Fort Early and Jubal Early Monument was started in the early 1900s, and consists of the remains of an American Civil War fort and monument located on a 1.29-acre (5,200 m^{2}) site at Lynchburg, Virginia. Confederate forces under the command of Lt. Gen. Jubal Early constructed the roughly square earthen fort in June 1864 as part of the outer defenses of Lynchburg as the Union Army of West Virginia, under Maj. Gen. David Hunter, advanced from the north and west in an attempt to capture the city during the Battle of Lynchburg. It is the only section of the Lynchburg defenses still in existence.

The walls of the fort are approximately 12 to 15 feet (4.6 m) in height on the exterior and approximately 4 to 6 feet (1.8 m) high on the interior. Within the fort is a one-story brick structure that was built in 1922 by the Fort Hill Woman's Club and contains exhibits on the Battle of Lynchburg. A brick paved entrance drive with a 15-foot (4.6 m) high iron arch erected in 1924, with the words "Fort Early", cut through the eastern portion of the breastworks and forms the entrance to the site. The remaining portions of the breastworks are intact including a sally port in the northern wall used to bring in ammunition and other supplies during the military operation of the fort. A 17-foot (5.2 m) high granite obelisk honoring Confederate General Jubal A. Early and erected in 1919, is located on a triangle of land formed by the intersection of Fort Avenue and Memorial Avenue.

It was listed on the National Register of Historic Places in 2002.

== Gallery ==
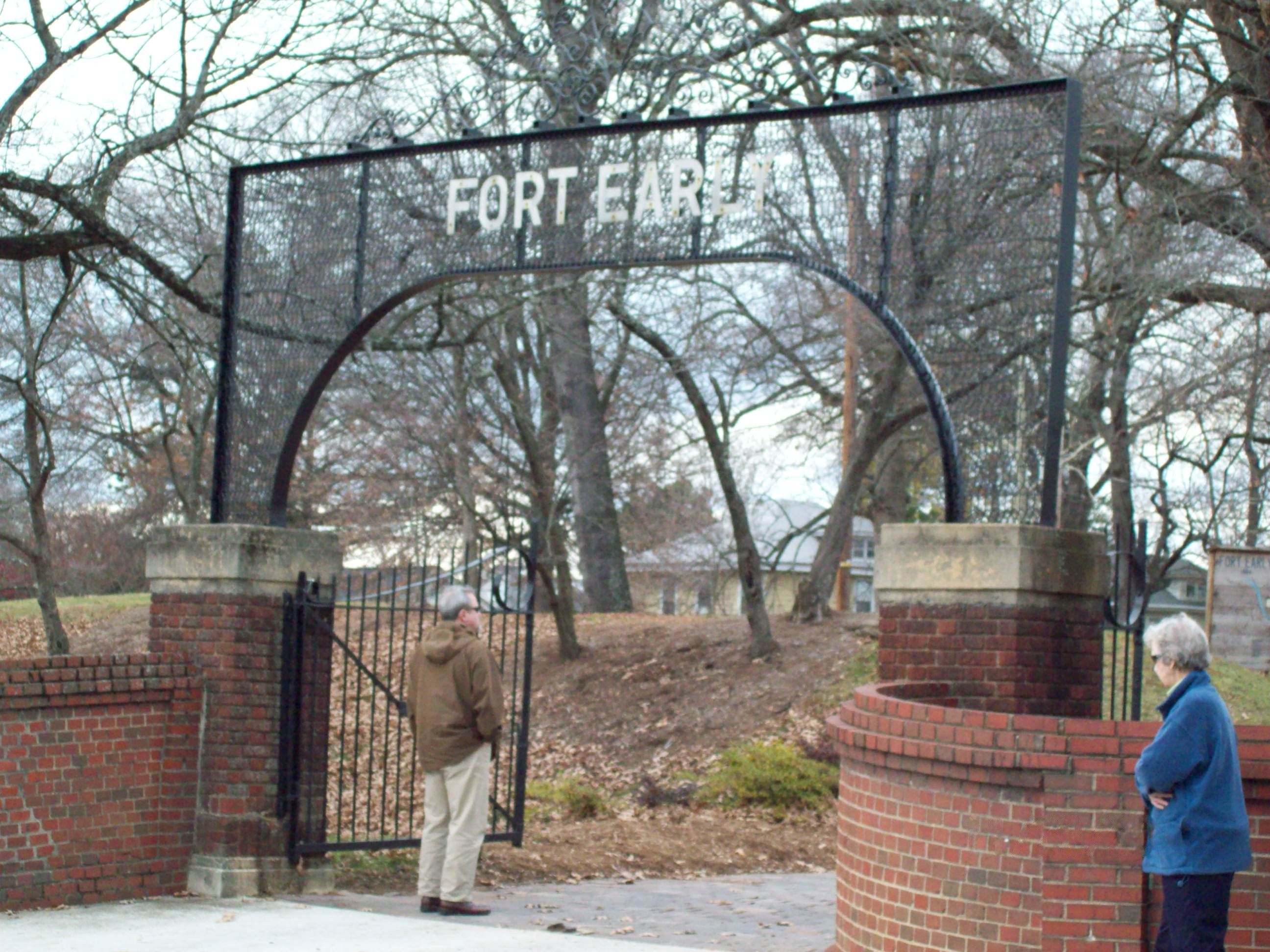
Fort Early Entrance Arch, Lynchburg VA, November 2008

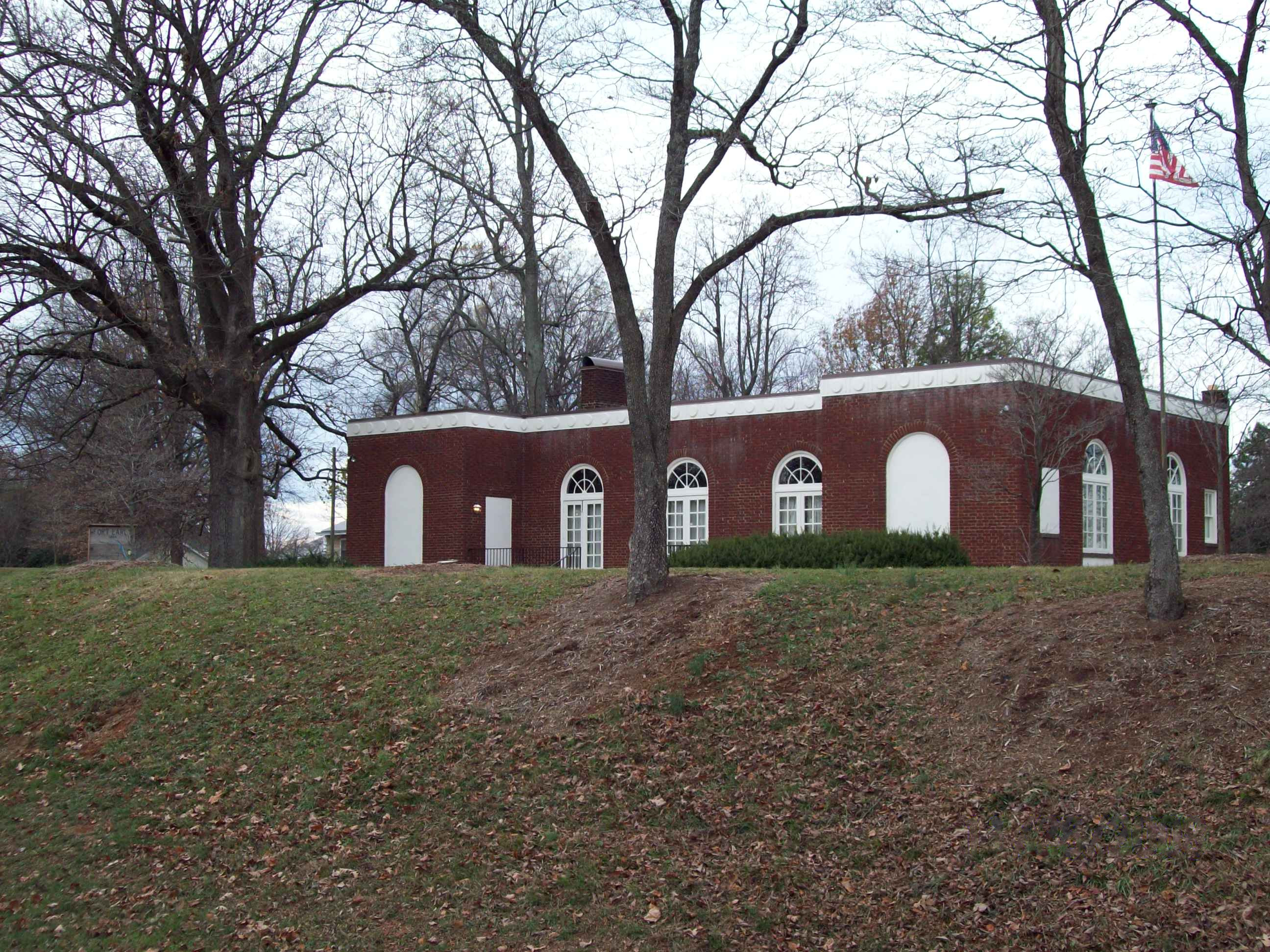
Fort Hill Woman's Club Clubhouse, Lynchburg VA, November 2008

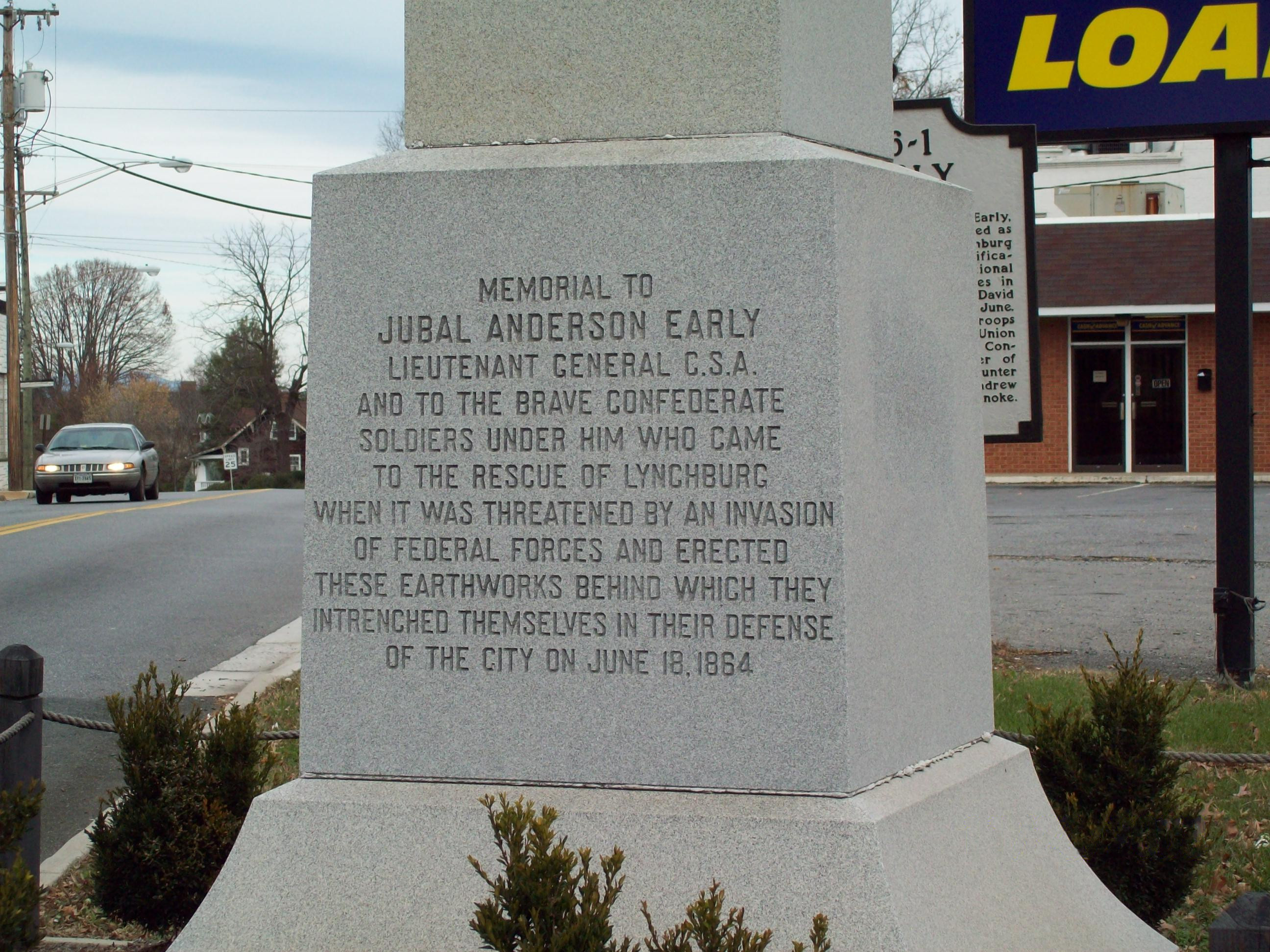
Inscription on the Jubal Early Monument, Lynchburg VA, November 2008

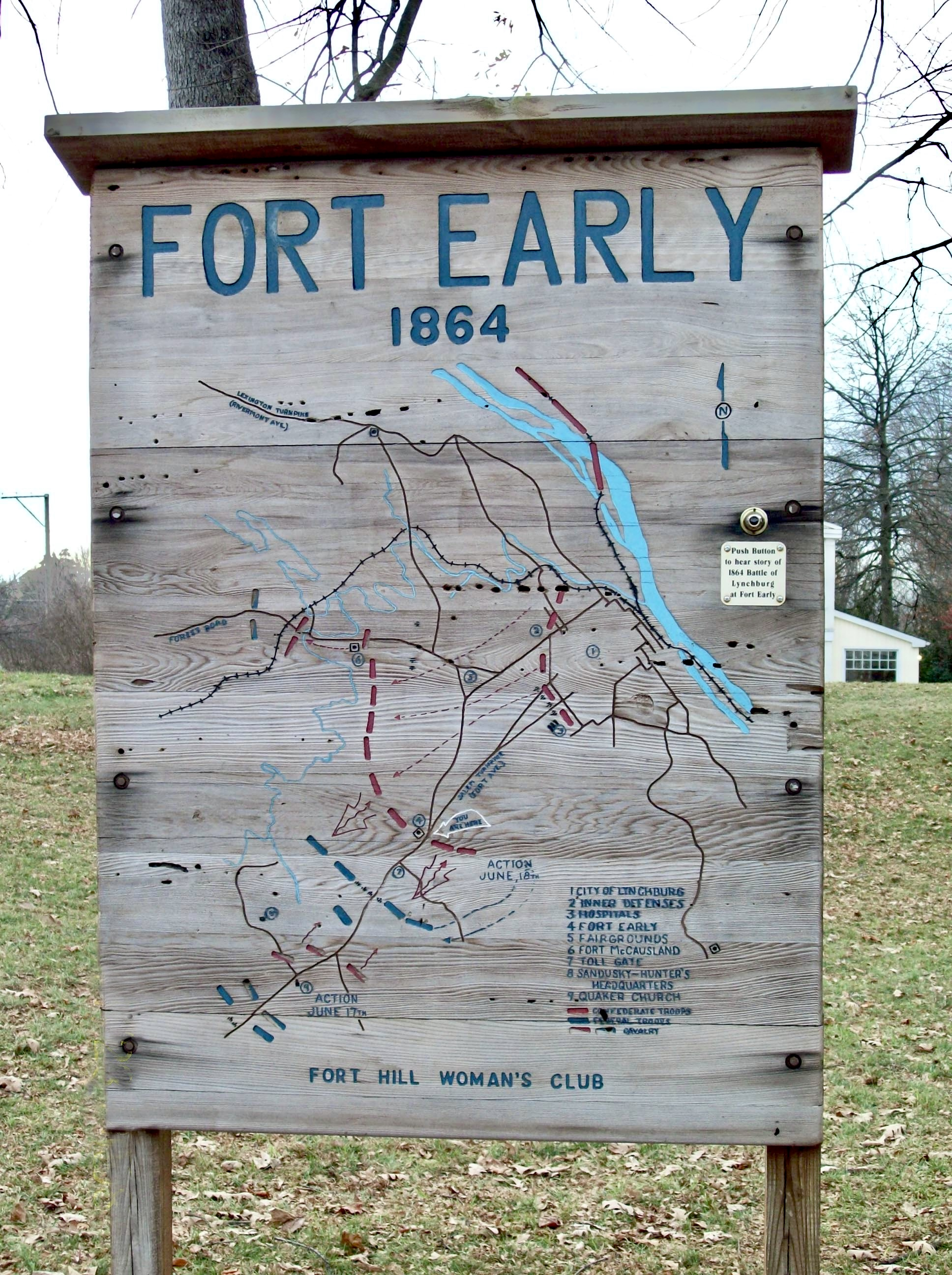
Map of the Battle of Lynchburg, Lynchburg VA, November 2008
