= J. William Jones =

American preacher (1836–1909)

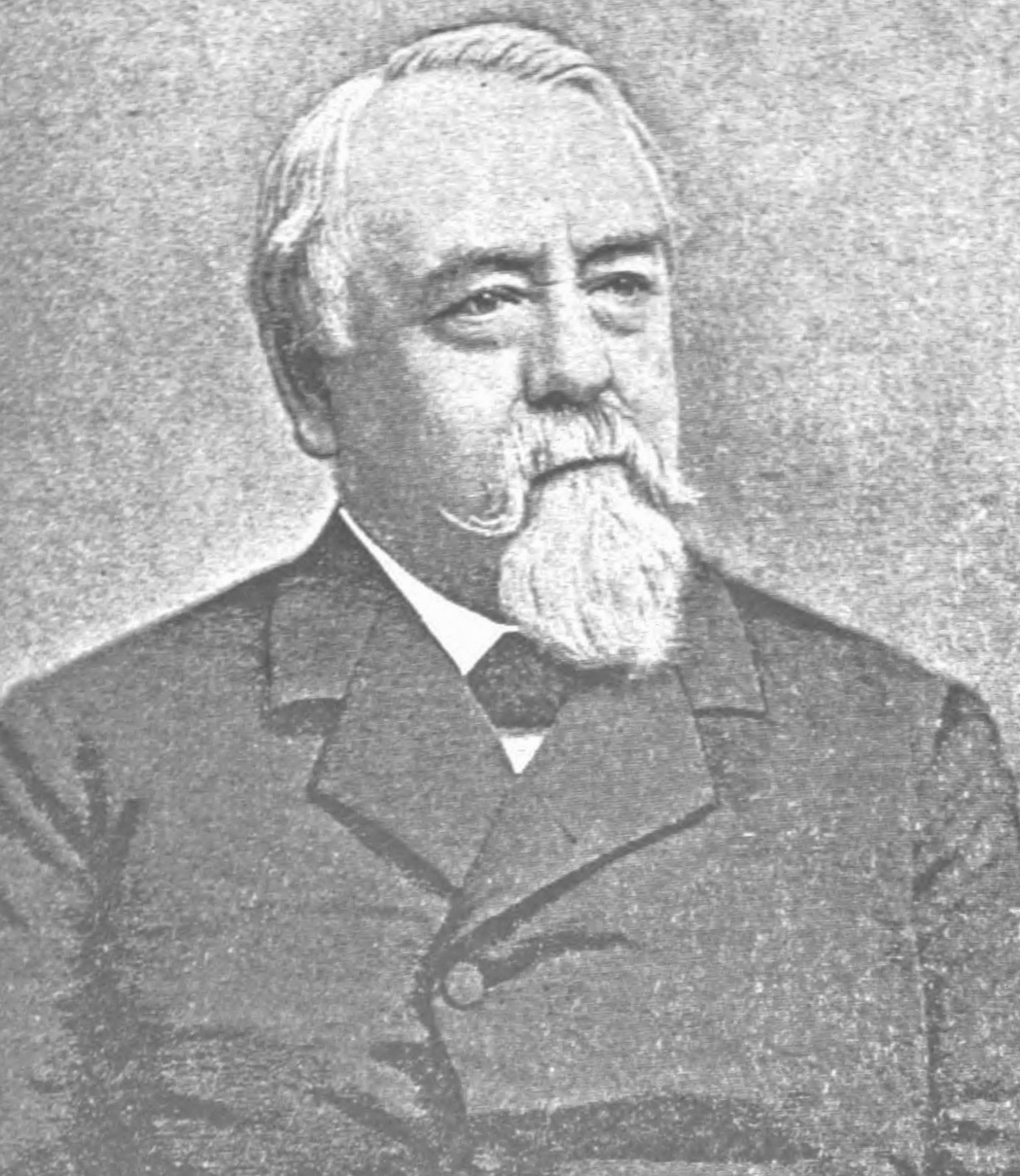
Portrait of Jones

J. William Jones (25 September 1836 – 17 March 1909) was an American Southern Baptist preacher and writer who became known for his evangelism and devotion to the Lost Cause of the Confederacy. During the American Civil War of 1861–1865, the newly ordained Jones was a Confederate chaplain and conducted many revival meetings. Later, he became a campus minister at several universities and in his final years, chaplain for the United Confederate Veterans. After editing the papers of Gen. Robert E. Lee, Jones became the Secretary-Treasurer of the Southern Historical Society for 14 years and served on his denomination's Home Missions Board. He wrote many books about the Lost Cause and Christianity.

== Early life ==
John William Jones was born on September 25, 1836, in Louisa County, Virginia. His father, merchant Francis William Jones (1811–1890) married Ann Pendleton Ashby Jones (1817–1863) in 1834, and owned six people in the 1850 census and eight in the 1860 census. The family had enough money to educate John, including at the University of Virginia in Charlottesville, Virginia (from which he graduated in 1859), and the first class to attend the Southern Baptist Theological Seminary in Greenville, South Carolina.

== Career ==
After ordination as a Baptist minister in Charlottesville, Jones first led Little River Baptist Church near his home in Louisa County, Virginia. When Virginia seceded from the union, he and his younger brothers Francis Pendleton Jones (1841–1863) and Philip Edloe Jones (1843–1863) enlisted in the "Louisa Blues", which became part of the 13th Virginia Infantry. Jones thus canceled his original plan to become a missionary in China. Their uncle, John M. Jones of Charlottesville, also resigned his U.S. Army commission to join the Confederate States Army, eventually rising to the rank of brigadier general, although like both younger Jones siblings, he did not survive the war.

Jones initially was the company chaplain, then the regimental chaplain, and led many mass revivals during the war, especially after being designated as the Baptist missionary to Lt. Gen. A.P. Hill's corps. Jones also helped found the chaplain's association of the Army of Northern Virginia. In writing about wartime chaplaincy, Jones estimated that he baptized 520 soldiers and preached at meetings (often with ministers of other Protestant denominations) that resulted in the conversion of at least 2000 men. He later recalled that Colonels often discouraged religion as they feared it might give soldiers qualms about killing the enemy, but the yeoman soldiers demanded it and considered sermons as their privilege.

After the war, Jones was a Baptist minister in Lexington, Virginia, and as campus minister at Washington College, later known as Washington and Lee University, in Lexington, where he often met with Robert E. Lee. Jones later was a pastor in Ashland, Virginia, and at Chapel Hill, North Carolina, as well as campus minister at his alma mater, the University of Virginia, and at the University of North Carolina at Chapel Hill in Chapel Hill, North Carolina. He later estimated that four-fifths of the college students had become Christians in army camps, and that nearly all were maintaining their faith, many becoming pillars in their local churches.

After a planned memorial volume concerning Gen. Lee by Washington College languished, Jones expanded the project with the approval of Lee's family, publishing his Personal Reminiscences, Anecdotes and Letters of General Robert E. Lee in 1874. Jones published another Lee biography in 1906, and both volumes collectively were reprinted 29 times before 2012. In 1875, Jones became secretary of the Southern Historical Society. Before resigning in 1887, he oversaw the publication of 14 volumes of papers, defending the Confederate States of America as righteous in waging a holy war against Northern intolerance of states' rights. Jones also defended the reputations of Lee, Jefferson Davis and Stonewall Jackson in many venues, as well as denounced Reconstruction and ignored violence of Southern white nationalists against African Americans.

By 1884, Jones had moved to Atlanta, Georgia, and become assistant corresponding secretary of his denomination's Home Mission Board (1884–1893). His Christ in the Camp (1887) was republished many times, and his textbook School History of the United States(1896) became widely used in the South. During his final years supervising Baptist missionaries (including his four sons), Jones also was the chaplain-general of the United Confederate Veterans (1890 to 1909). Jones wrote an article entitled "The Old Virginia Town, Lexington" for the first issue of the Confederate Veteran in 1893. Jones became the superintendent and secretary of the Confederate Memorial Association in 1903, which succeeded in finishing a memorial which now houses the Virginia Historical Society.

== Personal life ==
Jones married Judith Page Helm in Nelson County, Virginia on December 20, 1860. They had five children: Carter Helm Jones, Edloe Pendleton Jones, Francis William Jones, Meredith Ashby Jones, and Howard Lee Jones. Four of their sons became Baptist ministers.

== Death ==
Jones died on March 17, 1909, while visiting family in Columbus, Georgia. The Library of Virginia has his papers.

== Bibliography ==
- Personal Reminiscences, Anecdotes, and Letters of Gen. Robert E. Lee (1875).
- Southern Historical Society Circular (1876).
- Confederate View of the Treatment of Soldiers (1876).
- Stonewall Jackson: A Military Biography (1876).
- Army of Northern Virginia Memorial Volume (1880).
- General Lee to the Rear (1880).
- Virginia's Next Governor, Gen. Fitzhugh Lee (1885).
- Christ in the Camp (1887).
- Davis Memorial Volume; or, Our Dead President, Jefferson Davis (1890).
- School History of the United States (1896).
- The Morale of the Confederate Army (1899).
- Life and Letters of Robert Edward Lee: Soldier and Man (1906).
