= John A. Wharton =

Confederate Army general (1828–1865)

John Austin Wharton
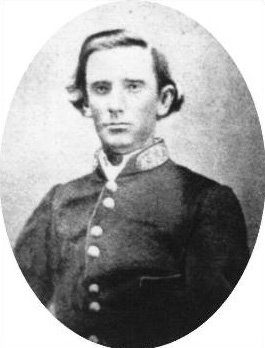
- Born: July 3, 1828; Nashville, Tennessee, U.S.
- Died: April 6, 1865 (aged 36); Houston, Texas, C.S.
- Burial place: Texas State Cemetery
- Military career
- Allegiance: Confederate States of America
- Branch: Confederate States Army
- Service years: 1861–1865
- Rank: Major General
- Conflicts: American Civil War: Battle of Shiloh; Battle of Perryville; Battle of Stones River; Battle of Chickamauga; Red River Campaign

John Austin Wharton (July 3, 1828 – April 6, 1865) was a Confederate general during the American Civil War. A lawyer and plantation owner, he was known for being one of the Confederacy's best tactical cavalry commanders.

== Early life ==
Wharton was born near Nashville, Tennessee, as the only child of Sarah Groce Wharton and William H. Wharton, later a leading politician during the Texas Revolution. He was named after his uncle, John Austin Wharton. When he was still an infant, the family moved to what became Brazoria County, Texas. In 1846, Wharton enrolled at South Carolina College, where he was a member of the Euphradian Society. Two years later, he married Eliza Penelope Johnson, the daughter of David Johnson, the Governor of South Carolina.

After graduating in 1850, Wharton returned to Texas and studied law, establishing his practice in Brazoria. He became a wealthy plantation owner and slave holder. In 1860, he supported John C. Breckinridge's candidacy for the Presidency and served as an elector.

== Civil War ==
An ardent secessionist, Wharton enlisted in the Confederate States Army as captain of Company B, 8th Texas Cavalry, also known as "Terry's Texas Rangers". Commissioned as colonel of the regiment, Wharton fought with distinction at the Battle of Shiloh, where he was wounded. Wharton served under Gen. Braxton Bragg during the 1862 invasion of eastern Kentucky. He was promoted to brigadier general on November 18, 1862, and was once more wounded at the Battle of Stones River.

Wharton again distinguished himself at the Battle of Chickamauga and was promoted to the rank of major general. He was assigned to the Trans-Mississippi Department in Louisiana in February 1864, leading the cavalry under Lt. Gen. Richard Taylor during the Red River Campaign.

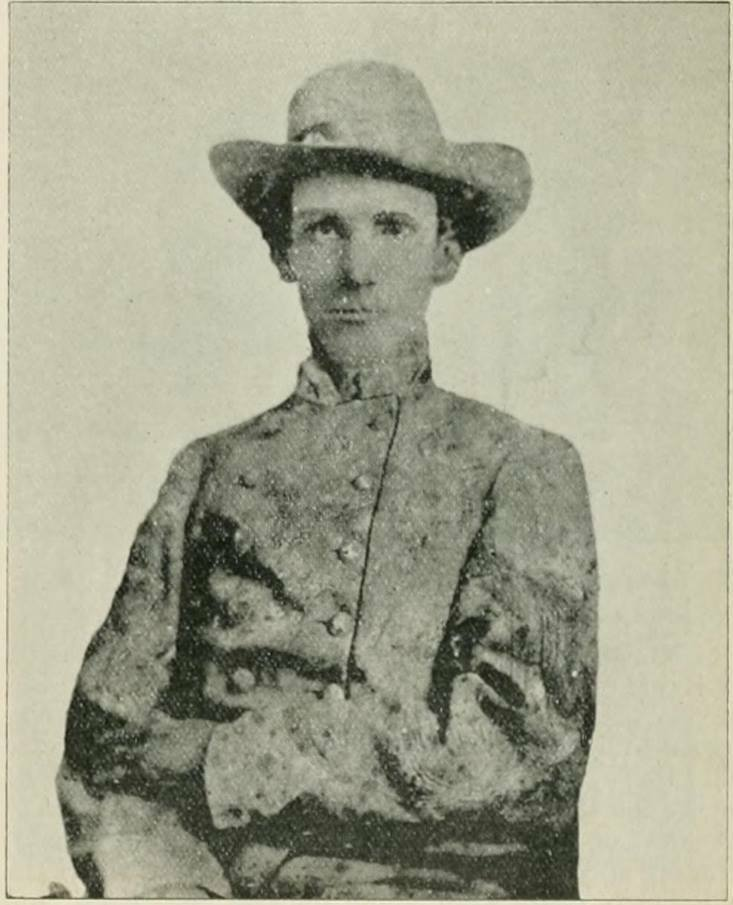
Wharton in Confederate uniform

Shortly before the end of the war in 1865, a fellow Confederate cavalry officer, Col. George Wythe Baylor (1832–1916) (brother of Confederate Arizona Governor Colonel John R. Baylor), killed Wharton in Houston, Texas, over a simmering dispute on military matters. The incident began with an argument on the street outside of the Fannin Hotel, the headquarters of Maj. Gen. John B. Magruder. The two officers had quarreled in the past, but this time Wharton came into Magruder's quarters and, as Baylor later claimed, called Baylor a liar. Baylor shot the unarmed Wharton and killed him instantly. Baylor was tried three times before he was finally acquitted after the war.

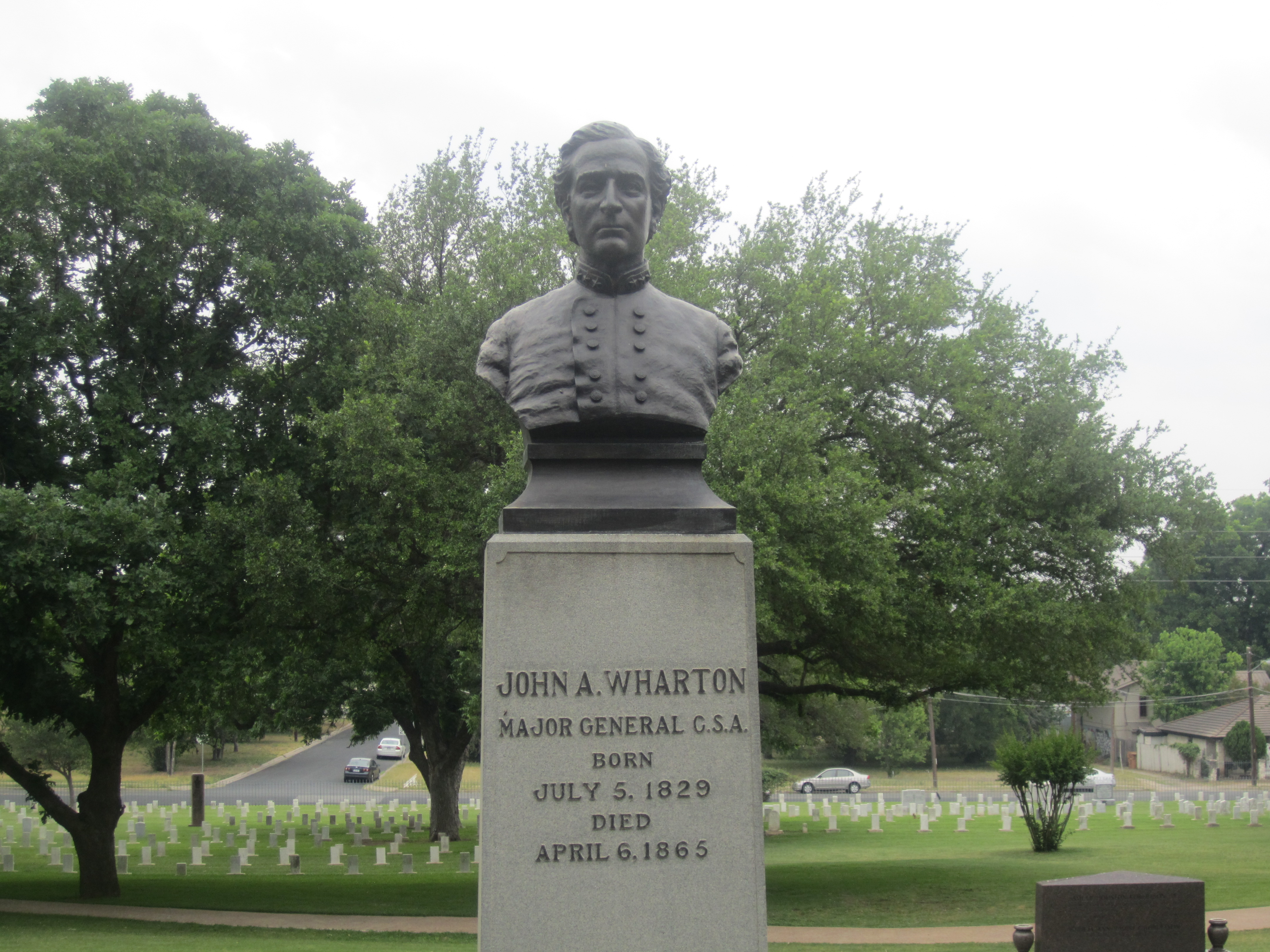
Wharton monument at Texas State Cemetery in Austin, Texas

Wharton is interred at Texas State Cemetery in Austin, Texas.

== See also ==
- List of American Civil War generals (Confederate)
