= List of American Civil War generals (Acting Confederate) =

Details concerning Confederate officers who were appointed to duty as generals late in the war by General E. Kirby Smith in the Confederate Trans-Mississippi Department, who have been thought of generals and exercised command as generals but who were not duly appointment and confirmed or commissioned, and State militia generals who had field commands in certain actions in their home states but were never given appointments or commissions in the Confederate States Army are in this list. Not all colonels or lower-ranking officers who exercised brigade or division command at any time are in this list but those most often erroneously referred to as generals are in the list. A few acting or temporary Confederate generals were duly appointed and confirmed as such. The full entries for these officers are in the List of American Civil War generals (Confederate).

Abbreviations and notes:

- Rank column: conf. = date appointment confirmed by Confederate Senate; nom. = date nominated by Confederate President Jefferson Davis; rank = date of rank.
- USMA = United States Military Academy at West Point, New York; "VMI" refers to the Virginia Military Institute at Lexington, Virginia; and South Carolina Military Institute or South Carolina Military Academy refers to their predecessor The Citadel at Charleston, South Carolina.
- Additional notes: ranks: lt. = lieutenant.

== Assigned to duty by E. Kirby Smith ==
After the fall of Vicksburg, communication between the Confederate Trans-Mississippi Department and the Confederate government in Richmond was slow and difficult. The commander of the department, General E. Kirby Smith, appointed several officers to duty as brigadier generals and as major generals. He tried to get President Jefferson Davis to formally appoint these officers and nominate them to the Confederate Senate for approval. While Davis did appoint some of Smith's earlier nominees, at least nine officers who were appointed by Smith late in the war and may have served in the capacity of generals for a period of time were never appointed and confirmed by the civilian authorities. The ten acting generals assigned to duty by General Smith listed below are in this category. One of them, Horace Randal, was killed in action while commanding a brigade at the Battle of Jenkins' Ferry under the overall command of General Smith.

| Name | Rank | Notes |
|---|---|---|
| Bagby, Arthur Pendleton Jr. | Colonel | Resigned as 2nd lieutenant, U.S. Army, September 30, 1853.; 7th Texas Cavalry: Major, October 12, 1861, Lt. Colonel, April 4, 1862, Colonel, November 15, 1862.; Assigned to duty as brigadier general, March 17, 1864, and major general, May 16, 1865 (to rank from May 10), by E. Kirby Smith.; Wounded at Berwick Bay, April 13, 1863.; Died February 21, 1921, Hallettsville, Texas, aged 87. |
| DeBray, Xavier | Colonel | Born Epinee, France, January 25, 1818.; St. Cyr graduate.; 4th Texas Infantry: 1st Lieutenant, 1861, major, September 2, 1861.; 7th Texas Cavalry: Lt. Colonel, December 7, 1861.; 26th Texas Cavalry, Colonel, March 17, 1862.; Assigned to duty as brigadier general, April 13, 1864, by E. Kirby Smith. |
| Gordon, Benjamin Franklin | Colonel | Mexican–American War.; Missouri State Guard, Lieutenant, 1861.; Wounded at Wilson's Creek.; 5th Missouri Cavalry: Major, 1862, Lt. Colonel, September 9, 1862, Colonel, December 15, 1862.; Assigned to duty as brigadier general, May 16, 1865, by E. Kirby Smith. |
| Jackman, Sidney Drake | Colonel | Missouri militia, lieutenant, then captain.; 7th Missouri Infantry, Colonel, 1862.; 16th Missouri Infantry, Colonel, August 31, 1862.; Jackman's Missouri Cavalry, Colonel, September 1864.; Assigned to duty as brigadier general, May 16, 1865, by E. Kirby Smith. |
| Jones, Alexander C. | Colonel | Born in 1830 in Marshall County, [West] Virginia; Graduated from VMI in 1850; Commissioned Major of the 44th Virginia; Commissioned Lt. Colonel in 1862; Wounded at the Battle of Gaines's Mill; Resigned commission and requests transfer to Trans-Mississippi Dept.; Requested by E. Kirby Smith that Jones be promoted to brigadier-general on March 16, 1865; Paroled at Brownsville, TX, July 24, 1865, as brigadier-general; Moved to Mexico to join Emperor Maximilian's army. |
| King, Wilburn Hill | Colonel | Missouri militia, Sergeant, 1861, Lieutenant, 1861.; 3rd Missouri State Guard, Captain, CSA, 1861.; Wounded at Wilson's Creek, August 10, 1861.; Resigned 1861 and returned to Texas.; 18th Texas Infantry: Private, 1861, Major, May 13, 1862, Lt. Colonel, February 25, 1863, Colonel, August 10, 1863.; Initial brigade command, 1863.; Wounded at Mansfield, Louisiana, April 8, 1864.; Assigned to duty as brigadier general, April 16, 1864, by E. Kirby Smith. |
| Lewis, Levin Major | Colonel | Missouri militia, Captain, 1861.; 3rd Missouri Militia Cavalry, Colonel, March 24, 1861.; Mustered out, May 1862.; Aide to Earl Van Dorn, March 1862.; 7th Missouri Infantry: Captain, June 18, 1862.; 16th Missouri Infantry: Major, 186.; Wounded at Lone Jack, Missouri, August 16, 1862.; 7th Missouri Infantry, Lt. Colonel, December 4, 1862, Colonel, March 4, 1863.; Wounded and captured at Helena Arkansas, July 4, 1863.; Exchanged September 1864.; Assigned to duty as brigadier general, May 16, 1865, by E. Kirby Smith. |
| Maclay, Robert Plunket | Major | USMA, 1840.; Wounded Resaca de la Palma, Texas, May 9, 1846 (start of Mexican–American War).; Resigned as Captain, U.S. Army, December 31, 1860.; Louisiana militia, Major, December 16, 1861.; Major of artillery, October 31, 1862.; Assistant Adjutant General and Commissary of Subsistence of Walker's Division, 1863.; Assigned to duty as brigadier general, May 13, 1864, to date from April 30, 1864, by E. Kirby Smith.; Not nominated. |
| Randal, Horace | Colonel | USMA, 1854.; Resigned as 2nd Lieutenant, U.S. Army, February 27, 1861.; Private, Virginia Infantry, 1861.; Captain CSA 1861, resigned June 1861.; 1st Lieutenant and aide to brother-in-law, Gustavus W. Smith, November 16, 1861.; Assistant inspector general, Smith's Corp, Army of Northern Virginia, 1861–1862.; 28th Texas Cavalry (dismounted), Colonel, February 18, 1861.; Initial brigade command, September 28, 1862, Trans–Mississippi Department.; Assigned to duty as brigadier general, April 8, 1864, by E. Kirby Smith.; Appointment revoked by Jefferson Davis.; Mortally wounded at Jenkins' Ferry, April 30, 1864.; Died of wounds, May 2, 1864, aged 31 or 33. |
| Terrell, Alexander Watkins | Colonel | Captain, aide to Henry E. McCulloch.; Resigned January 1862.; 1st Texas Cavalry: Captain, 1862, Major, 1862, Lt. Colonel, March 31, 1862, Colonel, June 12, 1862.; Arizona and New Mexico Cavalry Battalion, Lt. Colonel, June 8, 1863.; 34th Texas Cavalry, Colonel, June 20, 1863.; Assigned to duty as brigadier general, May 10, 1865, by E. Kirby Smith.; Fled to Mexico.; Colonel, Mexican Army, July 1865; resigned November 1865. |

== Incomplete appointments, unconfirmed appointments, refused appointments, posthumous appointments or undelivered commissions ==
The following Confederate officers are often referred to in historical writings as generals but their appointments were never completed or confirmed or their commissions were not properly delivered. The appointments of a few were withdrawn before they were voted upon by the Confederate Senate. Some of the officers' appointments were nominated to but not confirmed by the Confederate Senate. Some of the officers' commissions as generals were not delivered until after they had died. In a few cases, promotions of officers to general officer grades were posthumous even as early as the dates of appointment or nomination and clearly were meant only to be tokens of respect or honor. Other general officer commissions remained undelivered when the war ended. At least two general officer appointments that appear in the historical record were unauthorized battlefield appointments which were not approved and confirmed by the civil authorities as the war was coming to a close. Nonetheless, these officers are notable because of their assignments or actions in the capacity of a general, almost always a brigadier general. The Eichers call most or all such officers "might-have-beens." About 24 of the officers in the alphabetical tables above are shown by Warner and Wright as full grade general officers but in fact their appointments, confirmations or commissions were incomplete or they died or the war ended before they received their commissions. The entries for these officers will be moved to the section below as the article is completed.

| Name | Rank | Notes |
|---|---|---|
| Ashby, Henry Marshall | Colonel | Captain, 4th Tennessee Battalion, July 4, 1861.; 2nd Tennessee Cavalry, Colonel, May 24, 1862.; Wounded 1862.; First brigade command, June 1864.; Commissioned a brigadier general in April 1865 while commanding a division in Joseph Wheeler's corps.; Commission never delivered. |
| Ashby, Turner | Colonel; Brigadier General; May 23, 1862 unconfirmed at death | 7th Virginia Cavalry: Captain, April 18, 1861, Lt. Colonel, June 25, 1861, Colonel, March 12, 1862.; Commanded cavalry in Jackson's Valley Campaign of 1862.; Killed fighting a rear guard action against Union Army pursuing Stonewall Jackson's forces at Good's Farm, near Harrisonburg, Virginia, June 6, 1862, aged 33.; Warner lists as a general; Eicher does not. |
| Barry, John D. | Colonel; Brigadier General appointed August 2, 1864 unconfirmed canceled a few days later | North Carolina militia, Private, June 15, 1861.; 18th North Carolina Infantry: Private, November 14, 1861, Captain, April 1862, Major, November 11, 1862, Colonel, May 3, 1863.; Wounded 4 times.; Regiment in Pickett's Charge at Gettysburg.; Appointed Brigadier General, August 2, 1864, when Brigadier General J. H. Lane wounded at Cold Harbor.; Lane returned in a few days, Barry was wounded and disabled and his appointment canceled.; Died March 24, 1867, Wilmington, North Carolina, aged 27.; Warner lists as a general; Eicher does not. |
| Bartow, Francis Stebbins | Colonel; Brigadier General posthumous | Georgia legislator.; Georgia militia, Captain, 1856.; CSA Provisional Congress from Georgia, February 7, 1861–July 21, 1861.; 8th Georgia Infantry, Captain, May 21, 1861, Colonel, June 1, 1861.; Brigade command in Army of the Shenandoah, June 1861–July 21, 1861.; Killed at First Bull Run while commanding two of his brigade's regiments, July 21, 1861, aged 44.; Confederate Congress awarded him the posthumous rank of acting brigadier general. |
| Benton, Samuel | Colonel; Brigadier General rank: July 26, 1864 died before commission received | State legislator.; Mississippi secession convention delegate.; 9th Mississippi Infantry, 12-month regiment: Captain, April 1861.; 37th (later 34th) Mississippi Infantry: Colonel, April 1862.; Mortally wounded, Battle of Atlanta, July 22, 1864.; Died July 28, 1864, at Griffin, Georgia, before receiving commission as brigadier general to rank from July 26, 1864.; Warner lists as a general; Eicher does not. |
| Bowles, Pinckney Downie | Colonel | South Carolina Military Institute (The Citadel predecessor).; Colonel Alabama Militia, 1860.; 4th Alabama Infantry: Captain, April 1, 1861, Major, August 22, 1862, Lt. Colonel, September 30, 1862, Colonel October 3, 1862.; Temporary commands of brigade or brigade sized units starting January 7, 1865.; No record ever promoted to or confirmed as brigadier general.; Some sources claim commissioned brigadier general on April 2, 1865.; This date was after Confederate Senate adjourned for last time. |
| Brevard Jr., Theodore W. | Colonel; Brigadier General rank: March 22, 1865 nom: March 28, 1865 unconfirmed | 2nd Florida Battalion (Partisan Rangers): Captain, July 13, 1861, Major, August 14, 1862, Lt. Colonel, June 24, 1863, Colonel, June 11, 1864.; 11th Florida Infantry: Colonel.; Last general officer Jefferson Davis appointed, March 28, 1865, to rank from March 22, 1865.; Unconfirmed, Confederate Senate last met March 18, 1865.; Captured, Sailor's Creek.; Warner lists as a general; Eicher does not. |
| Browne, William M. "Constitution" | Colonel; Brigadier General temporary rank: from November 11, 1864 unconfirmed: rejected | Born 1823, Dublin, Ireland.; Emigrated to U.S. in 1855, Georgia in 1861.; Aide to Jefferson Davis with rank of colonel of cavalry.; Interim Confederate Secretary of State, March 18–27, 1862.; Briefly commanded brigade in defense of Savannah.; Nomination as brigadier general (temporary), November 11, 1864, rejected by Confederate Senate, February 18, 1865.; Warner lists as a general; Eicher does not. |
| Cobb, Thomas Reade Rootes | Colonel; Brigadier General rank: November 1, 1862 unconfirmed: died | Provisional Confederate Congress, February 1861.; Recruited Cobb's Legion, Colonel, August 28, 1861.; During the war, served in Confederate Congress.; Member of committee that drafted the Confederate constitution.; Mortally wounded, sunken road at Fredericksburg.; Died December 13, 1862, at Fredericksburg.; Brother of Major General Howell Cobb.; Warner lists as a general; Eicher does not. |
| Dearing, James | Colonel; Brigadier General rank: April 29, 1864 not confirmed; continued as brigade commander | USMA entered 1858; resigned April 22, 1861.; Confederate artillery, 1st Lieutenant, July 1861; Captain, April 1862, Major, May 1862.; Major of artillery at Gettysburg.; 8th Regular Cavalry, Colonel, April 1864.; Brigadier general, April 29, 1864, not confirmed, continued to command cavalry brigade.; Wounded at Jetersville, Virginia, April 5, 1865.; Mortally wounded at High Bridge, April 6, 1865, in pistol duel with Union Lt. Colonel (Brevet Brigadier General) Theodore Read, who also was killed.; Died April 23, 1865, at Lynchburg, Virginia.; Often identified as last Confederate general to die of wounds from battle despite lack of Senate confirmation.; Warner lists as general; Eicher does not. |
| Deshler, James | Colonel; Brigadier General rank: July 28, 1863 not confirmed | USMA, 1854.; Dropped as 1st Lieutenant, U.S. Army, as AWOL, July 15, 1861.; Captain of artillery, Army of the Northwest, July 1861.; Brigade adjutant at Cheat Mountain.; Shot at skirmish at Allegheny Summit, West Virginia, December 13, 1861.; Colonel, CSA, 1862, Artillery, April 1862.; Chief of artillery for Theophilus Holmes during Seven Days Battles.; Accompanied Holmes to Trans–Mississippi Department.; Captured commanding brigade at Arkansas Post, January 11, 1863; exchanged June 1863.; Brigadier general to rank from July 28, 1863, not confirmed.; Warner lists as a general; Eicher does not.; Killed by a shell at Chickamauga, September 20, 1863, aged 30. |
| Dunovant, John | Colonel; Brigadier General (temporary) rank: August 22, 1864 unconfirmed at death | Mexican–American War, sergeant, Palmetto Regiment.; Resigned as Captain, U.S. Army, December 29, 1860.; Major of militia.; 1st South Carolina Regulars in C.S.A., Colonel.; Cashiered for drunkenness.; Soon appointed Colonel of 5th South Carolina Cavalry by Governor Pickens.; Regiment ordered to Virginia in 1864.; Dunovant redeemed himself by his conduct.; Wounded at Haw's Shop, Virginia, May 28, 1864.; Appointed temporary brigadier general, August 22, 1864.; Killed during Siege of Petersburg, after capture of Fort Harrison, during Battle of Chaffin's Farm, in related fighting during Battle of Vaughan Road, October 1, 1864, aged 39.; Warner lists as a general; Eicher does not. |
| Fauntleroy, Thomas Turner | Brigadier General, Provisional Army of Virginia; Major; Refused brigadier general appointment | Born Richmond County, Virginia, October 8, 1795.; War of 1812 veteran.; Virginia legislator.; Major, U.S. Army, June 8, 1836.; Resigned as colonel, U.S. Army, May 13, 1861.; Brigadier general of Virginia militia, May 18, 1861–October 8, 1861.; General Samuel Cooper recommended appointment as brigadier general, July 9, 1861, but Fauntleroy refused the appointment.; 55th Virginia Infantry, Major, resigned August 30, 1861. |
| Fiser, John Calvin | Colonel | 17th Mississippi Infantry, 1st Lieutenant, May 27, 1861, 1st Lieutenant and Assistant Adjutant General, October 12, 1861, Lt. Colonel, April 26, 1862.; Wounded at Fredericksburg, Gettysburg.; Lost right arm at Knoxville, November 29, 1863.; Lt. Colonel February 12, 1864, Colonel February 26, 1864.; Resigned June 12, 1864.; Commanded a brigade of Georgia reservists in the 1865 Carolinas Campaign.; Appointment as brigadier general in the Confederate States Army never confirmed. |
| Frazer, John W. | Colonel; Brigadier General nom or appt: May 3, 1863 rank: May 19, 1863 unconfirmed | USMA, 1849.; Resigned as Captain, U.S. Army, March 15, 1861.; 8th Alabama Infantry: Lt. Colonel, June 17, 1861.; Resigned March 1862.; 28th Alabama Infantry: Colonel, November 2, 1862.; Brigadier general appointment unconfirmed.; Opposed Union Army occupation of East Tennessee.; Surrendered to Union Major General Burnside when learned Knoxville occupied and Buckner in retreat.; Captured at Cumberland Gap, Tennessee, September 10, 1863.; Released July 24, 1865.; Warner lists as a general; Eicher does not. |
| Garrott, Isham Warren | Colonel; Brigadier General rank: May 28, 1863 | Alabama legislator, 1845, 1847.; 20th Alabama Infantry: Lt. Colonel, September 16, 1861, Colonel, October 8, 1861.; At Mobile in 1861 and 1862.; Resisted Grant at Port Gibson, Baker's Creek.; Killed on the skirmish line at Vicksburg, June 17, 1863.; Commission as brigadier general to rank from May 28, 1863, received at headquarters after his death.; Not confirmed.; Warner lists as a general; Eicher does not. |
| Girardey, Victor J. B. | Brigadier General (temporary) rank: July 30, 1864 commissioned: August 3, 1864 unconfirmed? | Born June 26, 1837, Lauw, France.; Married Louisiana woman of French descent.; 1st Louisiana Infantry Battalion, 2nd Lieutenant, April 16, 1861, 1st Lieutenant and aide from Louisiana, October 12, 1861.; Captain and assistant adjutant general for Ambrose R. Wright during Seven Days' Battles until May 21, 1864; then on staff of William Mahone.; Promoted four grades to Brigadier General with temporary rank from July 30, 1864, for organization of defense of the Crater at Petersburg.; Eicher says not confirmed.; Warner lists as a general, says received commission August 3, 1864.; Killed August 16, 1864, in command of brigade at Fussell's Mill on Darbytown Road at the Second Battle of Deep Bottom. |
| Godwin, Archibald C. | Colonel; Brigadier General rank: August 5, 1864 unconfirmed | Major and assistant provost marshal in charge of prisons in Richmond, including Libby Prison.; 57th North Carolina Infantry: Colonel, July 17, 1862.; Wounded at Chancellorsville.; Captured at Rappahannock Bridge (Raccoon Ford), November 7, 1863.; Exchanged May 1864.; Killed at Third Winchester (Battle of Opequon), September 19, 1864.; Warner lists as a general; Eicher says appointment unconfirmed. |
| Goggin, James M. | Major; Brigadier General rank: December 4, 1864 cancelled unconfirmed | USMA, did not graduate.; Served in army of Republic of Texas.; 32nd Virginia Infantry: Major, July 1, 1861.; Assistant adjutant general for Magruder, Kershaw for most of war.; Commanded James Conner's brigade at Cedar Creek.; Brigadier general appointment, rank from December 4, 1864, cancelled.; Warner lists as a general; Eicher does not.; Returned to Kershaw's staff.; Captured at Sailor's Creek. |
| Hagan, James | Colonel | Born County Tyrone, Ireland, June 17, 1822.; Emigrated to Pennsylvania; moved to Alabama, 1837.; Captain, Texas Rangers, 1846.; Captain, U.S. Army Infantry, March 5, 1847, Third Dragoons, April 9, 1847, discharged July 31, 1848.; Captain, Alabama militia.; Major, 1st Mississippi Cavalry, October 29, 1861; Colonel, 3rd Alabama Cavalry, July 1, 1862.; Initial brigade command, July 1863.; Wounded November 1862, November 1863.; Resigned November 1863, resignation revoked 1864.; Commanded cavalry brigade under Wheeler in late 1864, 1865.; Appointed acting brigadier general February or March, 1865 (referred to in official reports); Not confirmed, commission never delivered.; Wounded at Monroe's Crossroads, March 10, 1865. |
| Hannon, Moses Wright | Colonel | 1st Alabama Cavalry: Captain 1861, Lt. Colonel, October 29, 1861.; 53rd Alabama Cavalry (partisan rangers), Colonel, November 5, 1863.; Resigned December 16, 1863, resignation revoked.; Acting brigadier general, 1864.; Wounded at Monroe's Crossroads, North Carolina, March 10, 1865.; Appointed brigadier general sometime between February 15 and March, 1865; referred to as such by Wheeler.; Commission never delivered, paroled as a colonel. |
| Harris, David Bullock | Colonel | Chief Engineer CSA; Alleged to have verbally promoted to Brigadier General by Jefferson Davis and sometimes listed as General; however died in 1864 before promotion could be processed |
| Harrison Jr, George P. | Colonel | Although he received a provisional appointment to the rank of Brigadier General 1865, it was never officially confirmed before the end of hostilities. |
| Hatton, Robert Hopkins | Colonel; Brigadier General not confirmed: died | Tennessee legislator, 1855–1857.; U.S. Representative, 1859–1861.; 17th Tennessee Infantry, Captain, May 7, 1861, Colonel, May 26, 1861.; Appointed brigadier general May 23, 1862, but killed May 31, 1862, and not confirmed.; Killed May 31, 1862, at Fair Oaks Station during Seven Pines, aged 35.; Warner lists as a general; Eicher does not. |
| Henderson, Robert Johnson | Colonel | Pre-war judge, major Georgia militia, Georgia legislator.; 42nd Georgia Infantry, Colonel, March 20, 1862.; Captured at Vicksburg, exchanged.; Wounded at Resaca, Georgia, May 13, 1864.; Initial brigade command March 1865.; Promoted by Joseph E. Johnston to acting brigadier general, March, 1865 at Bentonville.; Not officially appointed or confirmed. |
| Hodge, George B. | Colonel; Brigadier General nominations rejected paroled as brig. gen. | United States Naval Academy, 1845.; Resigned from U.S. Navy in 1850.; Kentucky legislator.; Enlisted as private, Kentucky militia, September 23, 1861; Captain, Assistant Adjutant General, November 16, 1861.; Elected to Confederate Congress; divided time with army.; Breckenridge staff.; Promoted to colonel.; Led a cavalry brigade under Wheeler.; In command of District of Southwest Mississippi and East Louisiana at end of war.; Twice nominated as brigadier general; twice rejected by Confederate Senate.; Paroled as brigadier general.; Warner lists as a general; Eicher does not. |
| Johnson, Adam Rankin "Stovepipe" | Colonel; Brigadier General (not confirmed) | Captain, Kentucky cavalry, October 1861.; Escaped from Fort Donelson with Floyd.; Colonel, 10th Kentucky Partisan Rangers.; Attacked Newburgh, Indiana with 12 men, two stove pipes used as "Quaker cannons," July 18, 1862.; Escaped by swimming Ohio River when Morgan's forces were surrounded.; Appointed brigadier general September 6, 1864, to rank from June 1, 1864.; Not confirmed by Confederate Senate.; Warner lists as a brigadier general; Eicher does not.; Accidentally shot, blinded by own men in attack on Union camp at Grubbs Crossroads, near Princeton. Kentucky, August 21, 1864.; Founded Marble Falls, Texas.; Died October 20, 1922, Burnet, Texas, aged 88. |
| Jones, John R. | Lt. Colonel; Brigadier General (not confirmed) | VMI, 1848.; Florida militia.; 33rd Virginia Infantry: Captain, June 22, 1861, Lt. Colonel, August 21, 1861.; Wounded at Malvern Hill and by a shell concussion at Antietam.; Appointed brigadier general to rank from June 23, 1862, but confirmation postponed, October 13, 1862; never confirmed.; Placed in command of brigade but left the field at Chancellorsville due to "ulcerated" leg; immediately relieved of command.; Captured July 4, 1863, at Smithburg, Tennessee.; Confederacy made no effort to obtain release.; Released July 24, 1865.; Warner includes him on list of generals despite lack of confirmation; Eicher does not. |
| Martin, John Donelson | Colonel; Acting Brigadier General appointed April 29, 1862 | Mexican–American War (Private in the 3rd Tennessee Infantry).; 154th (Senior) Tennessee Infantry: Captain, May 1861; Major, May 1861.; Raised and commanded the 25th Mississippi Infantry / 2nd Confederate Infantry Regiment on August 10, 1861.; Commanded a brigade at Iuka, Shiloh and Corinth.; Recommended for a Brigadier's promotion (and appointed Acting Brig. Gen.) after Shiloh.; Mortally wounded and died at Corinth on October 3, 1862. |
| Peter A. S. McGlashan | Brigadier general rank: April 1865 {See Note} | Commsison signed By Jefferson Davis but never set to Confedrate Congress for Confirmation See incomplete appointments section in List of American Civil War generals (Acting Confederate). |
| Moore, Samuel Preston | Colonel; Surgeon General | Physician, assistant surgeon, U.S. Army, March 14, 1835.; Major U.S. Army Medical Corps, March 30, 1849.; Resigned as Major, U.S. Army, February 25, 1861.; Surgeon General of the Confederate Army.; Frequently listed erroneously as a brigadier.; Repeated proposed legislation to give post of surgeon general automatic brigadier general rank failed.; Unsubstantiated statement of brigadier general, South Carolina militia, appointment in 1865. |
| Munford, Thomas Taylor | Colonel; Assigned {Acting Brigadier General} not commissioned/commission never received | VMI, 1852.; 2nd Virginia Cavalry, Lt. Colonel, May 8, 1861, Colonel, April 25, 1862.; Wounded at Turkey Bridge, Virginia, June 30, 1862.; 13th Virginia Mounted Rifles, Colonel.; Assigned as brigadier general by Fitzhugh Lee, November 9, 1864, not commissioned.; Commanded cavalry brigade and at end of war, a division, in Army of Northern Virginia.; Recommended for promotion by General Robert E. Lee March 23, 1865, to rank from November, 1864.; Commission never received.; Listed as a Brigadier General in command of Fitzhugh Lee's Division, Cavalry Corps of Maj Gen Fitzhugh Lee after the surrender of the Army of Northern Virginia April 1865; Died February 27, 1918, Uniontown Alabama, aged 86. |
| Northrop, Lucius B. | Colonel; Brigadier General rank: November 26, 1864 nomination not sent for Senate confirmation | USMA, 1831.; Severely wounded in Seminole Wars, 1839, and put on sick furlough.; Studied and practiced medicine.; Dropped from army for running a private practice in Charleston but restored by Secretary of War Jefferson Davis.; Resigned as Captain, U.S. Army, January 8, 1861.; Colonel and commissary general of the Confederacy, March 27, 1861–February 16, 1865.; Appointed brigadier general to rank from November 26, 1864, but nomination not forwarded to Confederate Senate.; Nonetheless shown on full general list by Wright, Warner; not listed as general by Eicher.; Relieved February 15, 1865.; Arrested June 30, 1865, on suspicion of deliberately starving Union prisoners.; Charges dropped, October 31, 1865. |
| O'Neal, Edward Asbury | Colonel; Brigadier General: commission cancelled | Alabama legislator.; 9th Alabama Infantry, Private, May 1861, Major June 6, 1861, Lt. Colonel, October 21, 1861.; 26th Alabama Infantry, Colonel, April 2, 1862.; Wounded at Seven Pines, at Boonsboro, at Antietam and at Chancellorsville.; Commanded a brigade at Chancellorsville.; Robert E. Lee returned O'Neal's brigadier general commission of June 6, 1863, and it was canceled. |
| Pegram, William "Willie" | Colonel; Acting brigadier general | Virginia Militia, Private, 1857, Sergeant, 1860, Sergeant-Major, 1861.; 21st Virginia Infantry, Private, April 1861.; Virginia Artillery 1st Lieutenant, May 1861, Captain, March 1862, Major, March 2, 1863.; Pegram's Artillery Battalion, Army of Northern Virginia, September 1863– April 1865.; Lt. Colonel, February 27, 1864, Colonel February 13, 1865, acting Brigadier General, March 1865.; Mortally wounded April 1, 1865, Five Forks.; Died April 2, 1865, Ford's Station, Virginia. |
| Phifer, Charles W. | Major; Acting brigadier general appt: May 25, 1862 canceled: October 16, 1862 | Directly commissioned into the U.S. Army, 1855.; Resigned as 1st Lieutenant, 2nd U.S. Cavalry Regiment, 1861.; Major, 6th Arkansas Cavalry Battalion, 1861.; Staff officer of Earl Van Dorn and Alexander W. Reynolds.; Appointed Acting brigadier General by Van Dorn.; Appointment not confirmed and canceled.; Captured at Vicksburg, 1863, paroled and exchanged.; Absent without leave, 1864.; Died December 25, 1896, Savannah, Georgia. |
| Porterfield, George | Colonel; Acting Brigadier General | VMI, 1844.; Mexican–American War.; 25th Virginia Infantry, Colonel, July 1, 1861.; In command in Department of Northwestern Virginia, May 4, 1861–June 8, 1861.; Acting brigadier general.; In command at Philippi, June 3, 1861.; Staff of Brigadier General William W. Loring; Chief of Ordnance on August 9, 1861.; Commanded a brigade under Edward "Allegheny" Johnson, April 21, 1862–May 1, 1862.; Not re-elected Colonel, 25th Virginia Regiment on May 1, 1862.; No action on appeal or promotion to brigadier general, soon resigned.; Found by Union troops in June or July 1862 and arrested.; Paroled but never formally exchanged, took no further part in the war.; One of the last three surviving members of Aztec Club (Mexican–American War officers).; Died February 27, 1919, Martinsburg, West Virginia, aged 96. |
| Rains, James Edwards | Colonel; Brigadier General rank, nom: November 4, 1862 not confirmed, died | 11th Tennessee Infantry: Private, April 1861, Captain, May 2, 1861, Colonel, May 10, 1861.; Initial brigade command, March 1862.; Occupied Cumberland Gap during winter of 1861–1862.; Flanked out of that position in June 1862.; Killed leading his men against a Union battery at Stones River, December 31, 1862, aged 29.; Warner lists as a general; Eicher does not. |
| Robertson, Felix Huston | Colonel; Brigadier General (temporary) rank: July 26, 1864 nom: rejected: February 22, 1865 | Resigned from USMA in January 1861.; Son of Jerome Bonaparte Robertson.; In charge of artillery of Wheeler's cavalry corps in Atlanta campaign.; Appointed brigadier general on July 26, 1864, but his nomination was rejected by Confederate Senate, February 22, 1865. A possible reason for the rejection: Robertson was ordered arrested for his role in the October, 1864 Saltville massacre.; Severely wounded at Buckhead Creek, near Augusta, Georgia, November 26, 1864.; Only native Texan to have been appointed a Confederate general.; Warner lists as a general; Eicher does not.; Last surviving general officer of the Confederacy if appointment counted despite Senate rejection.; Died April 20, 1928, Waco, Texas, aged 89. |
| Rucker, Edmund Winchester | Colonel; Brigadier General (Acting) | Nominated as acting Brigadier General but not confirmed by Confederate Congress November 1864 |
| Semmes, Raphael "Beeswax", "Bim" | Rear Admiral, Confederate States Navy; Brigadier General appointed April 5, 1865 (unconfirmed) | Midshipman, U.S. Navy, April 1, 1826; promoted through commander, U.S. Navy, September 14, 1855, resigned February 15, 1861.; Commander, C.S. Navy, March 16, 1861.; Commanded CSS Sumter, commerce raider, CSS Alabama. Wounded off Cherbourg France.; Commanded James River Squadron, February 18, 1865–April 9, 1865.; Assigned as a brigadier general by President Davis, April 5, 1865, to command the Danville, Virginia defenses.; Not confirmed.; Arrested for treason, December 15, 1865.; Released April 7, 1866. |
| Taylor, Thomas H. | Colonel; Brigadier General unconfirmed | Mexican–American War.; 1st Kentucky Infantry, a 12-month regiment, Lt. Colonel, July 3, 1861.; Commanded brigade at Cumberland Gap and with E. Kirby Smith in Kentucky.; Provost marshal for Pemberton at Vicksburg.; Captured, paroled and exchanged.; Provost marshal for S. D. Lee.; Post commander at Mobile, Alabama at end of war.; Appointed brigadier general November 4, 1862, but President Davis failed to nominate him to Senate at that grade. |
| Thomas, Bryan Morel | Colonel; Brigadier General rank: August 4, 1864 not confirmed | USMA, 1858.; Resigned as 2nd Lieutenant, U.S. Army April 6, 1861.; 18th Alabama Infantry, Major, July 1861.; Colonel of reserve cavalry regiment in Clanton's brigade in Alabama, 1864.; Commander of a mixed brigade of infantry, cavalry and artillery in the Department of the Gulf, September 1864–April 9, 1865.; Captured at Fort Blakely, Alabama, April 9, 1865.; Warner lists as a general; Eicher does not. |
| Walker, Francis Marion | Colonel | Mexican–American War.; 19th Tennessee Infantry, Captain, 1861, Lt. Colonel, June 11, 1861, Colonel, May 8, 1862.; Brigade command in June and July 1864.; Killed at Atlanta, June 22, 1864, aged 36 or 37.; Commission received one day later, June 23, 1864.; Eicher says not confirmed.; Neither Warner nor Eicher list as a general. |

== State militia generals ==
At the beginning of the Civil War, the Union Army incorporated most State militia units from the States adhering to the Union, mainly because they were offered for federal service by their States in response to President Abraham Lincoln's call for volunteers to put down the rebellion of the Confederate States. If the generals of these units did not receive appointments by the President of the United States and confirmation by the United States Senate and come into federal service with their units, new Union Army generals were appointed and confirmed for the Union Army brigades or divisions in which the units were placed. States often retained or further recruited some militia units for local defense but these units, including any generals, saw little, if any, combat in the Civil War as State units. State militia units remaining under State control did not leave their States for service elsewhere and few battles or lesser actions were fought in the Northern States. The battles of South Mountain, Antietam, Gettysburg and Monocacy were among the more notable exceptions.

The Confederate States Army followed a similar pattern with respect to incorporating volunteer militias but certain States retained a significant number of militia units for local defense. Because most of the battles of the Civil War occurred in Southern States, some of these units, and their State-appointed generals, saw significant service and combat. They were usually brought under the command of Confederate State Army commanders and forces in their areas but on a few occasions were the only forces available to oppose Union forces. State units fought in Texas, in Missouri, especially early in the war, in Virginia, especially during Jackson's Valley Campaign, in Mississippi, especially during the Vicksburg Campaign, in Georgia, especially during Sherman's March to the Sea, and in South Carolina, especially in the Carolinas campaign.

Authors have not always pointed out that the generals in certain Civil War battles, actions or campaigns were State militia generals, not duly appointed and confirmed Confederate States Army (almost always Provisional Army of the Confederacy) generals. They were fighting for the Confederate cause and may have commanded a large number of troops but they are still properly described only as State militia generals.

Many of the Southern States' militia officers are identified by historian Bruce C. Allardice. Allardice, and others like him who take an expansive view of Confederate general officer appointments, identify many militia officers who were never mustered into national service for the Confederacy, nor did they serve as generals in any campaign or significant battle. The list below does not include those officers. It is limited to those known to have served in the field in command of militia units, on in another significant capacity such as guard duty in an active theater or in temporary command of Confederate Army brigades or divisions.

Below is a list of the more significant State militia generals from the Confederate States. These generals commanded and participated in battles and campaigns, at least in their home states, and thus provided some field service during the war. As such, they are likely to be referred to as Confederate generals in some books, articles or sources, even though they were State militia generals and not duly commissioned Confederate generals.

| Name | Rank | Notes |
|---|---|---|
| Alcorn, James Lusk | Brigadier General, Mississippi Militia | Mississippi legislator.; Brigadier General of Mississippi State militia, January 23, 1861.; Captured at Helena, Arkansas, exchanged.; Mississippi militia, Colonel, 1862. |
| Anderson, Charles David | Brigadier General, Georgia Militia | Mayor of Fort Valley, Georgia.; 6th Georgia Infantry, Captain, May 27, 1861, Major, May 17, 1862, Lt. Colonel, May 15, 1863.; Resigned January 20, 1864.; Wounded and captured at Antietam, exchanged.; Wounded at Chancellorsville.; Aide to Georgia Governor Joseph E. Brown.; Brigadier General, 3rd Georgia Militia brigade.; Brigade fought in Atlanta campaign.; Sent to oppose Sherman's March to the Sea.; Wounded at Griswoldville, November 22, 1864. |
| Boggs, James | Brigadier General, Virginia Militia | Born, April 8, 1796, County Down, Ireland.; Moved to Virginia, 1807.; Virginia legislator.; Brigadier General, Provisional Army of Virginia, April 27, 1861–June 8, 1861.; Commander, 18th Brigade, Virginia militia, Valley District, November 1861.; Served in Jackson's Valley Campaign.; Died January 28, 1862, Pendleton County, Virginia. |
| John T. Hughes | Brigadier General, Missouri Militia | Born, July 25, 1817, near Versailles, Kentucky.; Moved to Fayette, Missouri when he was very young.; Private, 1st Regiment Missouri Mounted Volunteers of Doniphan's expedition (Mexican War).; Militia colonel, and state representative in 1854.; Colonel of the 1st Regiment, 4th Division, Missouri State Guard, 1861.; Participated in Battle of Carthage, Battle of Wilson's Creek, Siege of Lexington; At the Battle of Pea Ridge, took over command for the wounded Brigadier General William Yarnell Slack (March 1862).; Killed at the First Battle of Independence, MO, killed instantly by a shot to the head while leading a charge (August 1862).; Promoted posthumously to Brigadier General. |
| Carson, James Harvey | Brigadier General, Virginia Militia | Born February 11, 1808, near Winchester, Virginia.; Colonel Virginia militia.; Brigadier general, Virginia militia, 1859–retired December 1861.; Commander, 16th Brigade, Virginia militia, Valley District, November 1861.; Served in Jackson's Valley Campaign. |
| Carswell, Reuben Walker | Brigadier General, Georgia Militia | Georgia legislator.; Brigadier General, Provisional Army of Virginia, April 27, 1861–June 8, 1861.; 20th Georgia Infantry, 2nd Lieutenant, June 14, 1861, 1st Lieutenant, March 7, 1862.; Resigned March 8, 1862.; 48th Virginia Infantry, Captain, March 1862, Lt. Colonel, March 22, 1862.; Resigned November 12, 1864.; Georgia legislator.; 1st Brigade, Georgia militia, Brigadier General, May 1864.; Served in Atlanta campaign. |
| Chapman, Augustus A. | Brigadier General, Virginia Militia | Born March 9, 1803, Union, Virginia.; Virginia legislator.; U.S. Representative from Virginia, March 4, 1843–March 3, 1847.; Brigadier General, Virginia militia, 19th Brigade, 1861.; Brigadier General, Provisional Army of Virginia, April 27, 1861–June 8, 1861.; Served in the Kanawha Campaign.; Mustered out: 1862. |
| Chase, William Henry | Major General, Florida Militia | Born June 4, 1798, in Buckland, Massachusetts.; U.S. Army Major, Corps of Engineers.; Designed, construction many Gulf Coast forts, especially at Pensacola.; Resigned as Major, U.S. Army, October 31, 1856, after 41 years.; As Florida militia colonel, demanded surrender of Fort Pickens at Pensacola in January 1861.; No further part in war. |
| Clark, Edward | Brigadier General, Texas Militia Colonel, Confederate States Army | Republic of Texas staff, Mexican–American War.; Texas legislator.; Lieutenant governor of Texas, 1857– 1859.; Acting governor of Texas, March 18, 1861–November 7, 1861, after Sam Houston deposed as governor for refusing Confederate loyalty oath.; Colonel, Texas militia, 1861.; 14th Texas Infantry, Colonel, 1863.; Appointment as CSA brigadier general not confirmed.; Wounded at Pleasant Hill, April 9, 1864.; Brigadier general of Texas state militia, 1865. |
| Clark, John Bullock | Brigadier General, Missouri State Guard | Born April 17, 1802, Madison County, Kentucky.; Brigadier general Missouri militia.; Colonel, Missouri Volunteers, Black Hawk War.; Major General, Missouri Militia, 1836–1838 and 1848–1861.; U.S. Representative from Missouri, December 7, 1857–expelled July 13, 1861.; Father of Brigadier General John B. Clark, Jr.; Brigadier General of pro-Confederate Missouri State Guard, July 11, 1861–resigned December 6, 1861.; Wounded at Wilson's Creek.; Representative and senator from Missouri in Confederate Congress.; Died October 29, 1885, Fayette, Missouri. |
| Clark, Meriwether Lewis Sr. | Brigadier General, Missouri State Guard Colonel, Confederate States Army | Son of explorer William Clark.; USMA, 1830.; Resigned as 2nd Lieutenant, U.S. Army, May 31, 1833.; Missouri legislator.; Missouri militia major of Artillery, July 1, 1846–June 24, 1847.; Brigadier general, Missouri State Guard, 9th Division, May 18, 1861–resigned April 1862.; Confederate Artillery, Major, November 11, 1862, Colonel, April 16, 1862.; Aide to Braxton Bragg, July 17, 1862.; Assistant Inspector General, ordnance, August 14, 1864–April 6, 1865.; Brigade command in Appomattox Campaign.; Captured at Sailor's Creek. |
| Dahlgren, Charles G. | Brigadier General, Mississippi Militia | Brother of Union Navy Admiral John A. Dahlgren.; Brigadier General, Mississippi State Troops (Militia).; 3rd Mississippi Infantry Regiment (State), Colonel, 1861.; Commander, 3rd Brigade of Mississippi State Troops, July 8, 1861.; Objected to transfer of state troops to Confederate States Army.; State commission expired January 29, 1862, renewed for 1862-1863.; 1862: state commissioner to oversee gunboat construction; command at Fayette, Mississippi, no troops. |
| de Saussure, Wilmot Gibbes | Brigadier General, South Carolina Militia | South Carolina legislator.; Lt. Colonel, South Carolina Militia.; 1st South Carolina Artillery, Colonel, 1861.; Commander, 4th Brigade of Artillery, January 1861.; Served in the Second Battle of Charleston Harbor.; Brigadier general, South Carolina militia, August 1861. Adjutant General, South Carolina militia, April 11, 1862. |
| Ford, John Salmon | Brigadier General, Texas Militia Colonel, Confederate States Army | Physician, Indian fighter, Texas legislator, judge.; 1st Lieutenant, Republic of Texas army, 1836–1838.; Texas volunteers, spy, Mexican–American War.; Texas Rangers, Captain, 1849.; Texas militia, Colonel, 1861.; 2nd Texas Cavalry, CSA, Colonel, 1862.; Brigadier general, Texas militia, March 1, 1864.; Commanded a force at the Battle of Palmito Ranch, Texas, the last battle of the Civil War, on May 13, 1865. |
| Garlington, Albert Creswell | Brigadier General, South Carolina Militia | South Carolina legislator.; Brigadier general, South Carolina Militia, Brigade 10, 1861.; Holcombe's Legion, Major, December 19, 1861.; Resigned May 21, 1862.; Major general and Adjutant General and Inspector General, South Carolina militia, 1862–1865.; Served in the Carolinas campaign.; Disbanded militia troops, February 1865. |
| Greene, Colton | Brigadier General, Missouri State Guard; Colonel, 3rd Missouri Cavalry (CSA); Acting brigadier general (CSA) | Born July 7, 1833.; Aide to Claiborne Fox Jackson, 1861.; Brigadier general, Missouri State Guard, 1861.; Colonel, 3rd Missouri Cavalry Regiment, November 4, 1862; 1865; Acting brigadier general, Confederate States Army, March–December, 1864; Died September 23, 1900. |
| Harman, William Henry | Brigadier General, Virginia Militia | Born February 17, 1828, Waynesboro, Virginia.; Mexican–American War.; Brigadier general, 13th Brigade, Virginia militia, April 10, 1861.; Commanded part of a force that seized Harper's Ferry, April 18, 1861.; Colonel, Provisional Army of Virginia, April 27, 1861–June 8, 1861.; 5th Virginia Infantry, Lt. Colonel, May 7, 1861.; Replaced Kenton Harper as Colonel of the 5th Virginia Infantry regiment, September 11, 1861.; Aide to Edward Johnson, dropped April 1862.; Colonel, Virginia Reserves, 1864.; Killed at Waynesboro, Virginia, March 2, 1865. |
| Harper, Kenton | Major General, Virginia Militia | Born 1801, Chambersburg, Pennsylvania.; Moved to Virginia, 1823.; Captain, Virginia militia.; Mayor of Staunton, Virginia.; Virginia legislator.; Mexican–American War.; Major general and commander, 5th Division, Virginia militia, April 10, 1861.; Commanded a force that seized Harper's Ferry, April 18, 1861.; Brigadier general, Provisional Army of Virginia, May 1, 1861.; 5th Virginia Infantry, Colonel, May 7, 1861.; Virginia legislator.; Colonel CSA Virginia Reserves, June 2, 1864. |
| Harris, Jeptha Vining | Brigadier General, Mississippi Militia | Mississippi legislator.; Captain, Mississippi militia.; Brigadier general, CSA, Mississippi militia.; Captured at Vicksburg, July 4, 1863.; Exchanged July 16, 1863.; Mustered out August 26, 1863.; Colonel, Mississippi militia, August 26, 1864.; Mustered out 1865. |
| Harrison, Sr., George Paul | Brigadier General, Georgia Militia | Georgia legislator.; Brigadier general Georgia militia, training and organization, Georgia coastal defense, 1861–1862.; Colonel, Georgia militia, 1864–1865.; Captured December 1864. |
| McBride, James Haggin | Brigadier General, Missouri State Guard Colonel, Confederate States Army | Missouri legislator.; Brigadier general, Missouri State Guard, 7th Division, May 18, 1861.; Commanded 7th Division at the Siege of Lexington, Missouri.; Captured near Springfield, Missouri, February 16, 1862, exchanged; Resigned February 23, 1862.; Colonel, CSA, 1864.; Died of pneumonia at Bluffton, Arkansas, March 1864. |
| McCay, Henry Kent | Brigadier General, Georgia Militia | 12th Georgia Infantry, 2nd Lieutenant, June 15, 1861, Captain, February 6, 1862.; Wounded at Allegheny Mountain, Virginia, December 13, 1861.; Resigned March 14, 1863.; Captain and aide, Georgia militia, April 1864.; 1st Georgia Militia Battalion, Lt. Colonel, May 1864.; Georgia Militia, 4th Brigade, Brigadier General, June 1864.; Fought at Griswoldville. |
| Meem, Gilbert Simrall | Brigadier General, Virginia Militia | Virginia legislator.; Brigadier general, Virginia militia, April 10, 1861–resigned February 1, 1862.; Commander, 7th Brigade.; Jackson's Valley Campaign, November 1861–January 1862. |
| Pearce, Nicholas Bartlett | Brigadier General, Arkansas State Troops Major, Confederate States Army | USMA, 1850; Resigned as 1st Lieutenant, U.S. Army; April 20, 1858.; Colonel, Arkansas militia.; Arkansas State Troops, Brigadier General, May 1861.; Division command in the Trans-Mississippi Theater, 1861.; Major, CSA, 1861; Served in the Commissary Department throughout the war.; Paroled June 21, 1865. |
| Phillips, Pleasant J. | Brigadier General, Georgia Militia | Major, Georgia militia.; 31st Georgia Infantry, Colonel, November 19, 1861.; Resigned May 13, 1862.; Georgia militia, Brigadier General, July 7, 1862.; Colonel, Georgia militia, 1863.; Georgia militia, 2nd Brigade, Brigadier General, 1864.; Served in the Atlanta campaign.; Resigned November 1864. |
| Rains, George W. | Brigadier General, Georgia Militia Colonel, Confederate States Army | USMA, 1842.; Resigned as Captain, U.S. Army; October 31, 1856.; Confederate Major, 1861; Lt. Colonel, 1862; Colonel, 1863.; Established and commanded Confederate Powderworks.; Commanded 1st Regiment, Georgia Local Defense.; Served in the Savannah campaign.; Georgia militia, Brigadier General, 1865. |
| Smith, Francis Henney | Brevet Brigadier General, Virginia Militia Colonel, Confederate States Army | USMA, 1833.; Resigned as 2nd Lieutenant, U.S. Army, May 1, 1836.; Superintendent, Virginia Military Institute, 1839–1889.; Brevet Brigadier General, Virginia militia, April 24, 1861.; 9th Virginia Infantry, Colonel, July 7, 1861.; VMI Corps of Cadets battalion, Colonel, April 30, 1862–May 18, 1862; May 11, 1864–June 27, 1864; October 1864; March 1865–April 1865. |
| Steen, Alexander E. | Brigadier General, Missouri State Guard Colonel, Confederate States Army | Mexican-American War veteran.; Resigned from U.S. Army May 10, 1861.; May 1861: Colonel, CSA and ADC to Claiborne Fox Jackson.; Brigadier General Missouri State Guard, June 11, 1861.; Acting brigadier general, CSA, April 1, 1862; never confirmed.; Colonel, 10th Missouri Infantry Regiment (Confederate), November 1862.; Killed at the Battle of Prairie Grove, December 7, 1862. |
| Thompson, Meriwether Jefferson | Brigadier General, Missouri State Guard | Mayor of St. Joseph Missouri, 1859–1860.; Missouri militia, Lt. Colonel, 1861, Colonel April 1861.; Missouri State Guard, 1st Division, Brigadier General, July 25, 1861.; Captured at Pocahontas, Arkansas, August 22, 1863.; Exchanged August 3, 1864.; Sterling Price placed him in command of Brigade 1, Division 3, Cavalry Corps, Trans–Mississippi Army, (Shelby's Iron Brigade) September 8, 1864–December 3, 1864.; Commanded Division 3, District of Arkansas, Cavalry Corps, Trans–Mississippi Army, December 3, 1864–May 11, 1865.; Surrendered at Chalk Bluff, Arkansas, May 11, 1865. |
| Tupper, Tulius Cicero | Major General, Mississippi State Troops | Colonel in Mississippi Militia; Commissioned as Major General of the Mississippi State Troops, March 10, 1862.; Resigned commission, spring 1863 |
| Watkins, Nathaniel W. | Brigadier General, Missouri State Guard | War of 1812 and Mexican-American War veteran.; Brigadier General Missouri State Guard, May 17, 1861.; Resigned July 1861. |

== See also ==
- General officers in the Confederate States Army
- General officers in the United States
- List of American Civil War generals
- List of American Civil War generals (Confederate)
- List of American Civil War generals (Union)
- List of American Civil War brevet generals (Union)
