= David Bullock =

David Bullock may refer to:

- David Bullock (entrepreneur) (born 1993), American technology businessman and media executive known professionally as "Alaska".
- David Bullock Harris (1814–1864), American colonel in the Confederate States Army
- David Bullock (serial killer) (born 1960), American serial killer also known as "The .38 Caliber Killer"
