= Battle of Athens =

Battle of Athens may refer to:

== In Greece ==
- Noemvriana ("November Events"), also known as the "Greek Vespers", an armed clash between French sailors and Greek troops at Athens in 1916
- Battle of Athens (1941), a World War II air battle, part of the Battle of Greece in 1941
- Dekemvriana ("December Events"), armed clashes between communists and government/British forces in 1944

== In the United States ==
- Battle of Athens (1861), American Civil War battle in northeast Missouri in 1861
- Battle of Athens (1864), American Civil War battle in northern Alabama 1864
- Battle of Sulphur Creek Trestle, also called the Battle of Athens, American Civil War battle in northern Alabama in 1864
- Battle of Athens (1946), also called the "McMinn County War," an armed rebellion by returning WWII Veterans against the local government in Athens and Etowah, Tennessee, in 1946
