= 50th Georgia Infantry Regiment =

Infantry regiment of the Confederate States Army

- Unofficial Georgia flag prior to 1879
- Active: March 4, 1862–April 9, 1865
- Country: Confederate States of America
- Allegiance: Georgia
- Branch: Confederate States Army
- Type: Infantry
- Size: Regiment
- Engagements: American Civil War

Commanders
- Notable commanders: Col. William R. Manning; Col. Peter A.S. McGlashan

The 50th Georgia Infantry Regiment was an infantry regiment raised by the state of Georgia to fight for the Confederacy in the American Civil War.

The regiment was organized on March 4, 1862, at Camp Davis, about 28 miles from Savannah. The recruits were primarily from southern Georgia. The original commander was Col. William R. Manning (1817–1871). They were drilled at Camp Davis, just outside Guyton, Georgia. Upon being mustered into Confederate service, the regiment served in the Savannah defenses, Military District of Georgia. On July 17, 1862, Major General John C. Pemberton sent the 50th Georgia Volunteers to Richmond to join Drayton's Brigade in the First Corps, Army of Northern Virginia under its commanding general, Robert E. Lee.

For the majority of the war, the 50th Georgia served with the First Corps of the Army of Northern Virginia. The regiment participated in more than 45 engagements during the war. Some of the early battles in the East that the regiment took part in included South Mountain, Sharpsburg, Chancellorsville, and Gettysburg. The regiment went south when James Longstreet took his corps to Georgia and Tennessee in the fall of 1863, where it was engaged at the Siege of Knoxville. Returning to Virginia, the 50th Georgia fought in the Siege of Petersburg, the Battle of Cedar Creek, and the Battle of Sayler's Creek, where most of the regiment was captured.

The remaining men surrendered at Appomattox Court House on April 9, 1865. After parole, they returned to Georgia and civilian life, holding several reunions over the years.

== Organization ==
This regiment, formed in March 1862 served with the Army of Northern Virginia from July 1862 until its surrender at Appomattox Court House, except during Longstreet's 1863 expedition to Georgia and Tennessee. Upon reaching Virginia, it was assigned to Drayton's Brigade. During the Battle of Antietam (Battle of Sharpsburg), the regiment was assigned to .Toomb's Brigade. Toomb's Georgia troops were credited with defending the bridge over Antietam creek against several ill-fated attempts to cross it, until finally being pushed back late in the afternoon. After the battle, the 50th Regiment was permanently assigned to Paul Jones Semmes's Brigade. The subsequent brigade commanders were Goode Bryan and James P. Simms.

== Staff ==
=== Colonel ===
- William R. Manning (March 22, 1862, through July 31, 1863, Resigned)
- Peter Alexander Selkirk McGlashan (July 31, 1863, through end of war [captured at Sayler's Creek, Virginia, April 6, 1865, Released from Johnson's Island, Ohio, July 25, 1865])

Col Manning, was medically discharged from field hospital in Columbia, S.C., due to contracting Hepatitis. While in the hospital, he wrote three letters requesting medical discharge, supported by his doctor, to General Lee. The last letter was approved.

=== Lieutenant Colonel ===
- Francis Kearse (March 22, 1862, through July 2, 1863, Killed at Gettysburg, Pennsylvania)
- William O. Fleming (July 31, 1863, through December 22, 1863, Resigned)
- Pliney Sheffield (December 21, 1863, through November 28, 1864, Resigned [Wounded in right arm necessitating amputation at the Battle of the Wilderness on May 6, 1864])

=== Major ===
- Phillip Coleman Pendleton (March 22, 1862, through October 8, 1862, Resigned)
- Duncan Curry (October 8, 1862, through February 24, 1863, Resigned)
- William O. Fleming (February 24, 1863, through July 31, 1863, Promoted to Lieutenant Colonel)
- Pliny Sheffield (July 31, 1863, through December 21, 1863, Promoted to Lieutenant Colonel)
- John M. Spence (December 21, 1863, through February 14, 1865, when granted a leave of absence)

== Companies ==
- Company A - Satilla Rangers (Pierce County)
- Company B - Ware Volunteers (Ware County)
- Company C - Coffee County Guards (Coffee County)
- Company D - Valdosta Guards (Lowndes County)
- Company E - Thomas County Rangers (Thomas County)
- Company F - Decatur Infantry (Decatur County)
- Company G - Clinch Volunteers (Clinch and Echols Counties)
- Company H - Colquitt Marksmen (Colquitt County)
- Company I - Berrien Light Infantry (Berrien County)
- Company K - Brooks Volunteers (Brooks County)

== Battles ==
The 50th Georgia Infantry Regiment fought in the following battles:

- Second Bull Run (August 28–30, 1862)
- South Mountain (September 14, 1862)
- Antietam (September 17, 1862)
- Fredericksburg (December 13, 1862)
- Chancellorsville (May 1–4, 1863)
- Gettysburg (July 1–3, 1863)
- Chickamauga [not engaged] (September 19–20, 1863)
- Chattanooga Siege (September–November 1863)
- Siege of Knoxville (November–December 1863)
  - Battle of Fort Sanders (November 23, 1863)
- The Wilderness (May 5–6, 1864)
- Spotsylvania Court House (May 8–21, 1864)
- North Anna (May 23–26, 1864)
- Cold Harbor (June 1–3, 1864)
- Petersburg Siege (June 1864-April 1865)
- Cedar Creek (October 19, 1864)
- Sayler's Creek (April 6, 1865)
- Appomattox Court House (April 9, 1865)

== See also ==
- List of Civil War regiments from Georgia
