= James Boggs (general) =

American politician

- Born: April 8, 1796; County Down, Ireland
- Died: January 28, 1862 (aged 65); Pendleton County, West Virginia
- Burial place: Franklin, West Virginia
- Military career
- Allegiance: Confederate States of America
- Branch: Virginia militia
- Service years: 1861–1862
- Rank: Brigadier General
- Conflicts: American Civil War

James Boggs (April 8, 1796 – January 28, 1862) was a brigadier general in the Virginia militia, who served along with the Confederate States Army in northwestern Virginia at various times during 1861 and early 1862 in the American Civil War. Boggs's men participated in Stonewall Jackson's attacks on the towns of Romney and Bath, later Berkeley Springs, now in West Virginia in early January 1862. Debilitated from his responsibilities and the harsh winter weather at his advanced age, Boggs's health failed and he died on January 28, 1862.

Prior to the civil war, Boggs had been a farmer and slave owner, county justice, county sheriff, merchant and a member of the Virginia General Assembly in 1861–1862.

== Early life ==
James Boggs was born in County Down, Ireland on April 8, 1796. His parents were John and Margaret (Kee) Boggs. He was the oldest of seven children. The Boggs family moved to western Virginia in 1807.

Boggs owned a large farm in Pendleton County, Virginia, now West Virginia, and had seventeen slaves to operate it. He was engaged in politics over the years, holding the office of county sheriff in 1843, being a justice of the county in 1842 and again from 1852 to 1862 and being a state representative in the Virginia House of Delegates from 1861 to 1862. He became a prosperous merchant in Franklin, Virginia, now West Virginia, mainly occupied in that business by 1860.

== American Civil War service ==
Boggs was a brigadier general of the 18th Brigade in the Virginia militia at the outbreak of the civil war. As Virginia forces were organized into the Provisional Army of Virginia prior to their incorporation in the Confederate States Army, Boggs became a brigadier general of that force between April 27, 1861, and June 8, 1861, when it was incorporated into the Confederate Army. Boggs remained with the Virginia militia forces, commanding a brigade in the Valley District in May 1861.

After a quiet period, Boggs's men were called for duty in November 1861. The call was met with some resistance because of the divided loyalties of the population in western Virginia. Boggs himself had a brother who became a captain in the Union Army. Boggs had to request help from the Confederate Army to get the men from the area to report for militia duty. As troops gathered, Boggs was once again in command of the small brigade in the Valley District.

Stonewall Jackson then ordered the local militia, including Boggs's brigade and those of James Harvey Carson and Gilbert S. Meem, to report to Winchester, Virginia for training. After a short time, parts of the brigade went to Moorefield, Virginia, now West Virginia, to fight Union home guard militia units. In early January, Jackson moved against the Union held towns of Romney and Bath (Berkeley Springs) and occupied those towns. Boggs's men protected Jackson's flank along the Potomac River south of Romney. After Jackson took possession of the area, Boggs's men were split into smaller units which were placed on guard duty throughout the South Branch Valley area.

On February 3, 1862, under orders of January 30, 1862 from the Confederate States Secretary of War Judah P. Benjamin, the garrison left by Jackson to hold Romney departed for Winchester, Virginia because of its vulnerable location and a build-up of Union troops intent on retaking the town. The Union force re-entered the town without opposition on February 6, 1862.

== Death ==
By the end of 1861, the 65-year-old Boggs was worn out by his responsibilities, campaigning and harsh winter weather. When his troops were deployed for guard duty after the capture of Romney, Boggs returned to his home in Pendleton County. He died there on January 28, 1862. He was buried in Mount Hiser Cemetery in Franklin, West Virginia.

== See also ==
- List of American Civil War generals (Acting Confederate)
