= Henry Marshall Ashby =

Confederate Army officer (1836–1868)

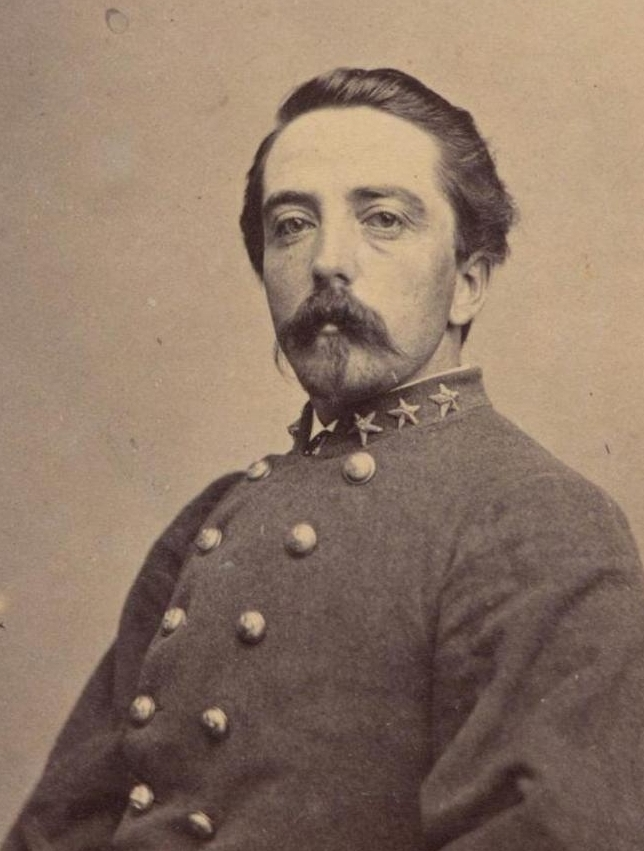
- Portrait of Colonel Henry M. Ashby in uniform
- Born: c. 1836; Fauquier County, Virginia
- Died: July 10, 1868 (Aged 31 or 32); Knoxville, Tennessee
- Burial place: Old Gray Cemetery; Knoxville, Tennessee
- Military career
- Allegiance: Confederate States of America
- Branch: Confederate States Army
- Service years: 1861–1865
- Rank: Colonel; Acting Brigadier General
- Commands: 2nd Tennessee Cavalry Regiment; Ashby's Cavalry Brigade; Humes's Division (acting)
- Conflicts: American Civil War

Henry Marshall Ashby (c. 1836 – July 10, 1868) was a Confederate States Army colonel during the American Civil War (Civil War). Although he commanded a brigade from June 1864 and a division at the Battle of Bentonville and through the surrender of the Confederate force under the command of General Joseph E. Johnston, he was never appointed a brigadier general by Confederate President Jefferson Davis or confirmed as a general officer by the Confederate Senate.

== Early life ==
Henry Marshall Ashby was born in Fauquier County, Virginia, in about 1836. His parents were Marshall and Lucinda (Cocke) Ashby. He was the cousin of another Confederate cavalry officer, Colonel Turner Ashby.

Ashby attended The College of William and Mary in 1853 and 1854 but did not graduate. He was a trader in Chattanooga, Tennessee, when the Civil War began although he was visiting an uncle in Knoxville, Tennessee, when the war broke out.

== American Civil War service ==
Henry Marshall Ashby enlisted in the Confederate States Army on July 6, 1861, at Knoxville, Tennessee, organized a company of cavalry and was elected captain. This company was assigned to the 4th Tennessee Cavalry Battalion which became part of the 2nd Tennessee Cavalry Regiment. Ashby was elected colonel of the regiment on May 24, 1862. The 2nd Tennessee Cavalry operated in east Tennessee in 1862 and 1863, usually in the brigade of Brigadier General John Pegram. Ashby was wounded in the right foot during one of three raids into Kentucky made by his regiment during 1862.

Pegram's brigade joined the Army of Tennessee and Ashby's regiment helped destroy a Union Army wagon train at the Battle of Stones River (December 31, 1862, January 2, 1863). The brigade then again engaged in independent operations in Kentucky. The brigade again fought with the Army of Tennessee at the Battle of Chickamauga on September 19 and 20, 1863. Pegram transferred to the Army of Northern Virginia after the battle but Ashby and his regiment remained with the Army of Tennessee.

Under the overall command of Major General Joseph Wheeler, Ashby's regiment was heavily engaged in the Battle of Brown's Mill near Newnan, Georgia, on July 30, 1864. They helped turn back a raid south of Atlanta by Union Brigadier General Edward M. McCook, who had been sent by Major General William T. Sherman to cut supply and communication lines to Atlanta. In June 1864, Ashby was assigned to command a brigade of four Tennessee cavalry regiments in Brigadier General William Y.C. Humes's division in Major General Wheeler's corps during the Atlanta campaign.

Ashby's brigade harassed Sherman's advanced units during the Carolinas campaign in early 1865. Because Humes was wounded on March 10, 1865, at the Battle of Monroe's Crossroads, Ashby, who was the senior colonel in Humes's division and who had also been briefly disabled by having his horse shot from under him at the same battle, led the division at the Battle of Bentonville and until the end of the war. Although sometimes referred to as an acting brigadier general, Ashby ended the war as a colonel. Major General Wheeler later wrote that he had been told unofficially by Confederate War Department officials that brigadier general commissions had been issued for Ashby, James Hagan and Moses Wright Hannon near the end of the war, no such commissions ever were delivered. Ashby signed a parole on May 3, 1865, as "Colonel, commanding Division."

== Aftermath ==
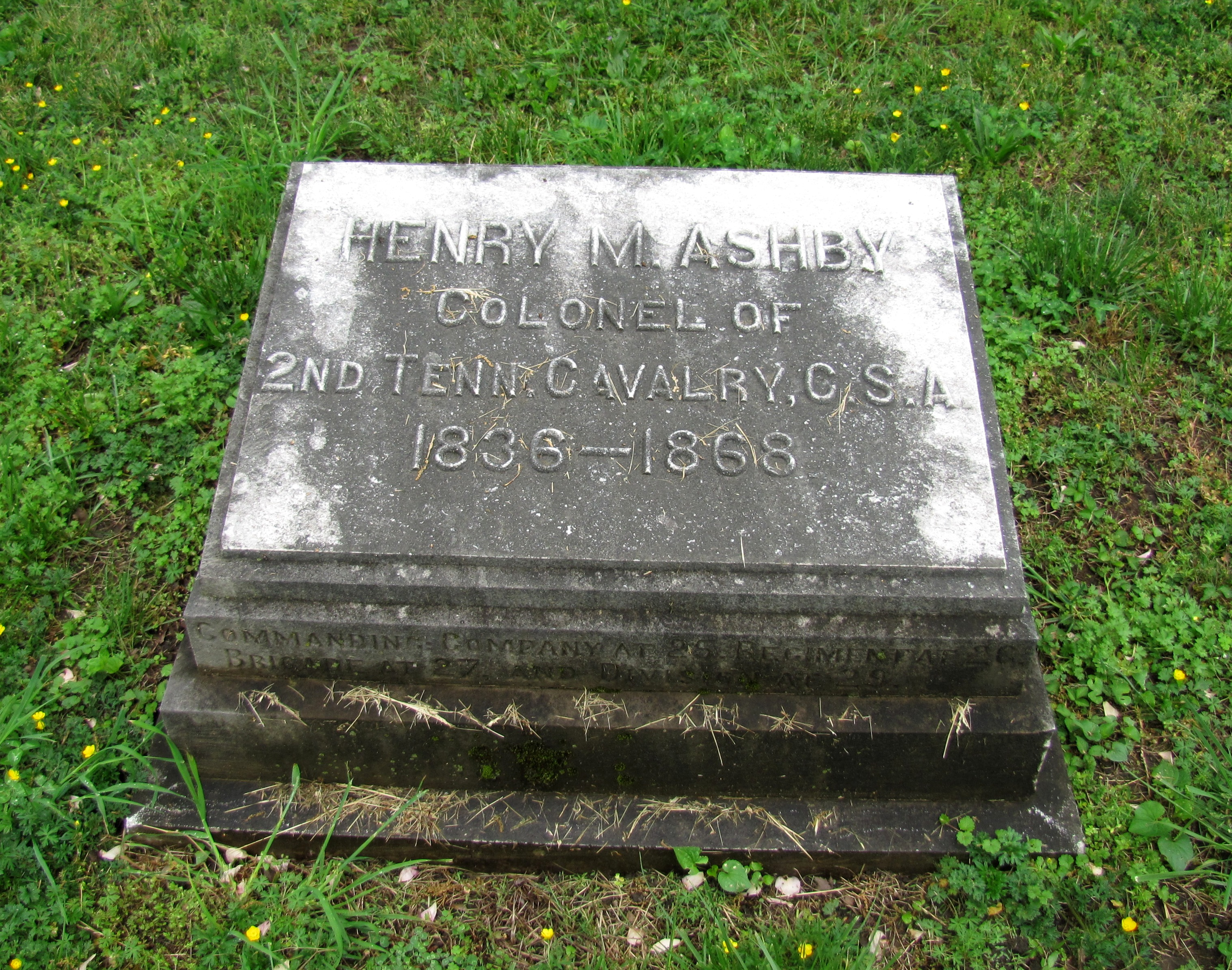
Grave of Ashby in Old Gray Cemetery

After the war, Ashby visited New York City but soon returned to Knoxville. On July 10, 1868, E.C. Camp, a former Union Army major, local lawyer and future coal industry tycoon, having quarreled with Ashby previously and having accused him of mistreating Union prisoners during the war, shot Ashby to death on Main Street in Knoxville. Camp said the shooting was in self-defense and he was never prosecuted. Shortly after the war, Camp became embroiled in a quarrel with Colonel Henry Ashby, a native Virginian who had fought for the Confederacy. In 1866, Camp accused Ashby of cruelly mistreating 431 Union soldiers that had been captured by Confederate forces in 1862, leading to Ashby's arrest and indictment for treason. Ashby posted bail and fled to Atlanta, but returned to Knoxville in 1868 after the charges were dropped.[10] On July 9, 1868, Ashby encountered Camp on Gay Street, and a brief struggle ensued, with Ashby attacking Camp with a cane, and Camp striking Ashby with an umbrella.[10] The following day, Ashby confronted Camp at the latter's law office near the corner of what is now Walnut and Main. According to some reports, Ashby attempted to strike Camp with a cane, and according to others, Ashby drew a derringer. In any case, Camp drew a pistol and fired, killing Ashby.[10] After Camp was arrested for murder, his bail was posted by several former Unionists, among them future Knoxville Journal editor William Rule. Knoxville's pro-Democratic newspaper, the Daily Press and Herald, dubbed Camp a cold-blooded killer, while the city's pro-Republican paper, the Knoxville Whig, hailed him as a hero. The county's acting district attorney eventually issued a nolle prosequi, and Camp was never prosecuted for the killing. Henry Marshall Ashby was buried in Old Gray Cemetery in Knoxville.

== See also ==
- List of American Civil War generals (Acting Confederate)
