= Moses Wright Hannon =

Confederate Army officer (1827–1897)

- Born: December 14, 1827; Baldwin County, Georgia
- Died: June 3, 1897 (aged 69); Leon County, Texas
- Burial place: Leon County, Texas
- Military career
- Allegiance: Confederate States of America
- Branch: Confederate States Army
- Service years: 1861–1865
- Rank: Colonel; Assigned to duty as: Brigadier General
- Conflicts: American Civil War

Moses Wright Hannon (December 14, 1827 – June 3, 1897) was a Confederate States Army colonel during the American Civil War. In August 1864, he was assigned to duty as an acting brigadier general by General John Bell Hood, subject to appointment by Confederate President Jefferson Davis and confirmation by the Confederate Senate. Although Hannon commanded a brigade in the cavalry corps of the Army of Tennessee and in Major General Joseph Wheeler's cavalry corps from June 1864 until the end of the war, he never was officially appointed by Jefferson Davis and confirmed by the Confederate Senate to brigadier general rank.

== Early life ==
Moses Wright Hannon was born in Baldwin County, Georgia, on December 14, 1827. His parents were John and Elizabeth (Wright) Hannon.

After being raised in Georgia, in 1847, Hannon joined his older brothers at Montgomery, Alabama, where he became a wealthy merchant. He married Caroline Mastin of a prominent local family. Hannon and his family moved to California in 1850 and returned to Montgomery in 1858.

== American Civil War service ==
Moses Wright Hannon was elected captain of a company of the 1st Alabama Cavalry Regiment when the Civil War began. He was promoted to lieutenant colonel on December 3, 1861. He fought with his regiment at the Battle of Shiloh on April 6–7, 1862.

On November 5, 1862, Hannon became colonel of the 53rd Alabama Cavalry Regiment (Partisan Rangers), which he had raised. The regiment performed guard duty around Tuscumbia, Alabama, until April 1863 when it was assigned to the cavalry brigade of then Colonel Philip Roddey under then Brigadier General Nathan Bedford Forrest in northern Alabama.

Hannon's regiment was transferred to the Army of Tennessee on August 15, 1863, and fought at the Battle of Chickamauga, September 19–20, 1863. On December 16, 1863, Hannon resigned as colonel of the regiment for reasons now unknown but he revoked the resignation the following month.

During the Atlanta campaign, starting in April 1864, Hannon commanded a small brigade in the division of Brigadier General William Y.C. Humes and, starting in June 1864, the division of Brigadier General John H. Kelly in Major General Joseph Wheeler's cavalry corps. He also commanded Kelly's division occasionally.

In August 1864, Hannon's brigade raided Union Army supply lines around Atlanta, Georgia. With 300 men, Hannon attacked a Union Army wagon train and seized over 1,000 cattle. General John Bell Hood, then in command of the Confederate army defending Atlanta, was so pleased with the additional meat supply for his army that he promoted Hannon to acting brigadier general, subject to appointment and confirmation by Confederate President Jefferson Davis and the Confederate Senate.

Hannon's brigade was part of Wheeler's force which opposed Major General William T. Sherman's March to the Sea and Carolinas campaign. Hannon was wounded again at the Battle of Monroe's Crossroads, near Kinston, North Carolina, on March 10, 1865, and was disabled for the remainder of the war.

Although Hannon was assigned to duty by Hood as an acting brigadier general in August 1864, he never received a commission and there is no record of an official appointment from Jefferson Davis or confirmation by the Confederate Senate of Hannon's appointment as a general officer. Major General Wheeler later wrote that he had been told unofficially by Confederate States War Department officials that brigadier general commissions had been issued for Hannon, Henry Marshall Ashby and James Hagan near the end of the war, but no such commissions ever were delivered. Hannon stated that he was a colonel in his pardon application but he was signing letters as a former brigadier general in the Confederate service by 1876 and "general" appears on his tombstone.

== Aftermath ==
After the war, Hannon again engaged in business as a merchant at Montgomery and at New Orleans. In 1870, he moved to Freestone County, Texas, where he was a planter until at least 1883. Finally, he moved to Leon County, Texas.

Moses Wright Hannon died on June 3, 1897, at Oakwood, Leon County, Texas. He is buried in Oakwood Cemetery in Leon County, Texas.

== See also ==
- List of American Civil War generals (Acting Confederate)
