= 9th Illinois Infantry Regiment =

- Illinois state flag
- Active: April 26, 1861 to July 9, 1865
- Country: United States
- Allegiance: Union
- Branch: Infantry
- Engagements: Battle of Fort Donelson; Battle of Shiloh; Siege of Corinth; Battle of Corinth; Vicksburg Campaign; Central Mississippi Campaign; Battle of Athens; Battle of Rocky Face Ridge; Battle of Kennesaw Mountain; Battle of Peachtree Creek; Siege of Atlanta; Battle of Jonesborough; March to the Sea; Carolinas campaign; Battle of Jonesborough

The 9th Illinois Infantry Regiment was an infantry regiment that served in the Union Army during the American Civil War.

== History ==
=== Initial 3 month service ===
Shortly after the Battle of Fort Sumter, President Lincoln called for 75,000 volunteers. They were to serve for three months. The state of Illinois put out a call to form units. Six companies came from St. Clair County. (Note: Most of those volunteering from St. Clair county were recent German immigrants. Of the entire regiment, about half of the officers and men were German immigrants.) Madison County sent three companies. Montgomery county sent one company. All nine companies met at Springfield, Illinois, on 23 April 1861. There they were mustered in by Captain John Pope on April 26, 1861, and formed into the 9th Regiment, Illinois, volunteer infantry. There were rumors that the Confederates intended to invade at Cairo, Illinois. In response, orders were issued for the 9th Infantry to occupy Cairo. The regiment was moved to Cairo for garrison duty near the Mississippi River until July, 1861. They arrived and set up camp on 1 May 1861. It was then attached to Prentiss' Brigade. Companies "C" and "H" formed part of an expedition from Cairo to Little River on June 22 and 23rd. By the time the regiment was mustered out on July 26, 1861, they had lost nine to disease.

=== 3 year service ===
Most of the men reenlisted for three years. In September the regiment moved to Paducah, Kentucky. There they did little more than drill practice. On 15 February 1862 they joined the fighting at the Battle of Fort Donelson. Their losses included 36 killed and 165 wounded, out of a total strength of 600. After the Confederates surrendered, they were transported by riverboats up the Tennessee River. They left the boats at Pittsburg Landing, Tennessee, and camped nearby. On 6 April 1862 they woke up to the sound of cannons. While they were waiting to join the battle, new orders were given. They were ordered to exchange their gray coats for Union blue. This way they would not be mistaken for Confederate troops. They then joined the battle of Shiloh. They fought most of the day. At Shiloh the 9th Illinois had the highest casualties of any Illinois unit. They lost 366 of their comrades They also fought at the Second Battle of Corinth. The regiment was changed to the 9th Illinois Mounted Infantry Regiment on March 15, 1863. The regiment fought in the Battle of Athens in 1864. On 9 July 1865 the 9th Illinois Infantry was mustered out (released from military service) at Louisville, Kentucky.

== Total strength and casualties ==
The regiment suffered 5 officers and 211 recruited men killed in action or mortally wounded. 1 officer and 200 enlisted men died of disease. In total there were 417 casualties (persons killed or wounded).

== Uniforms ==
The 9th Illinois volunteers, along with the 8th, 11th, and 12th, all wore gray coats trimmed in blue. They also wore Zouave caps. In 1862, they were refitted with the standard Union blue uniforms. Most of the Illinois infantry regiments were issued the Springfield Model 1861 muskets.

== Commanders ==
- Colonel Augustus Mersy - Mustered out with the regiment. (Note: Awarded rank of Brevet Brigadier General of Volunteers)

== See also ==
- 9th Illinois Cavalry Regiment
- List of Illinois Civil War units
