= James Hagan (Confederate colonel) =

Confederate States Army colonel

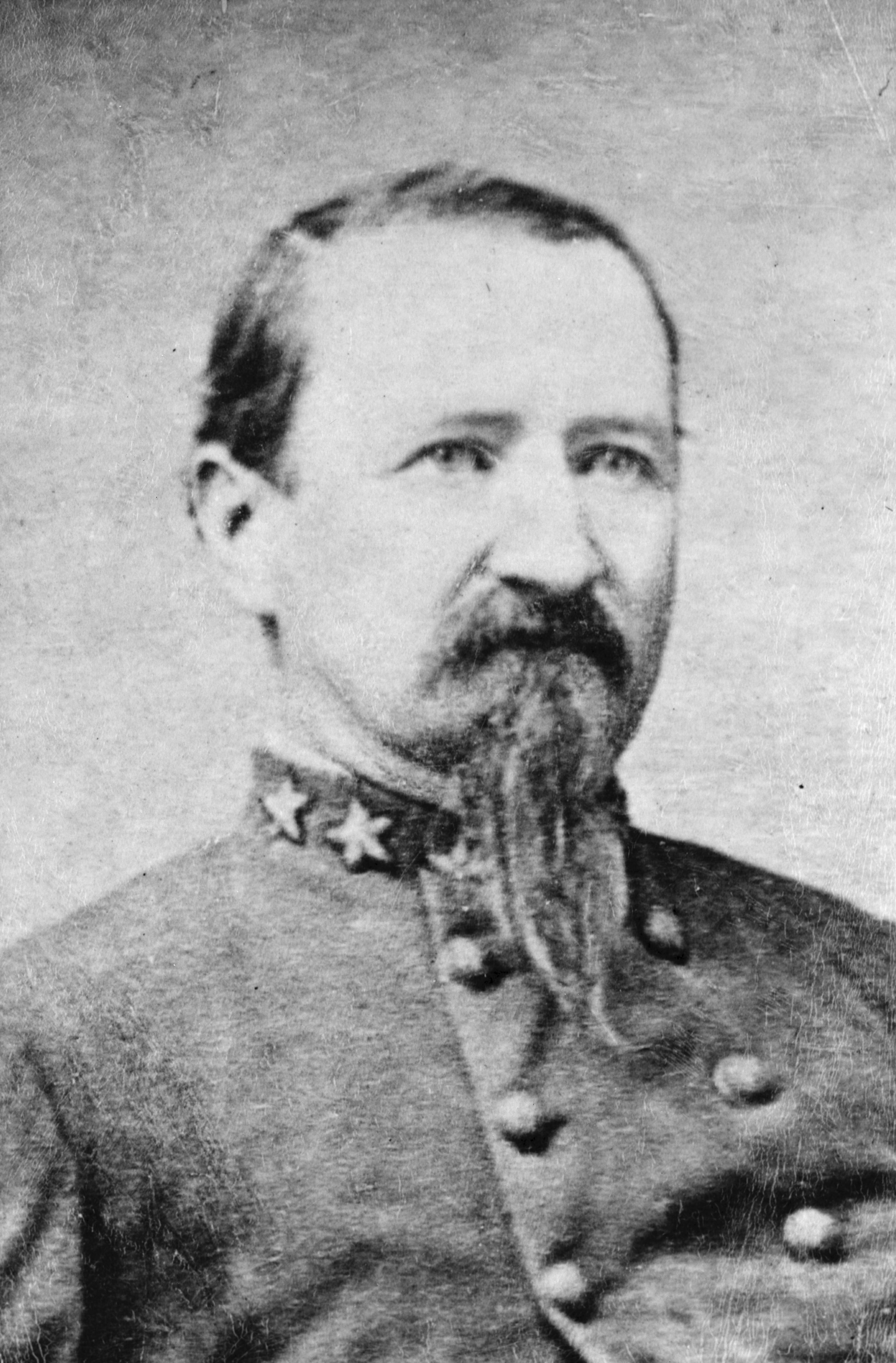
- Born: June 17, 1822; County Tyrone, Ireland, U.K.
- Died: November 6, 1901 (aged 79); Mobile, Alabama
- Burial place: Magnolia Cemetery; Mobile, Alabama
- Military career
- Allegiance: United States of America; Confederate States of America
- Branch: United States Army; Confederate States Army
- Service years: 1846–1848 (USA); 1861–1865 (CSA)
- Rank: Captain (USA); Colonel (CSA); Acting Brigadier General
- Units: Hays's Texas Rangers; 3rd U.S. Dragoons; 1st Mississippi Cavalry
- Commands: 3rd Alabama Cavalry; 1st Brigade, Martin's Cavalry Division; Hagan's Cavalry Brigade
- Conflicts: Mexican-American War; American Civil War
- Other work: Plantation manager

James Hagan (June 17, 1822 – November 6, 1901) was a United States Army captain during the Mexican–American War and a Confederate States Army colonel during the American Civil War. He was also a prosperous businessman and planter in Mobile, Alabama between both conflicts.

Although he commanded a brigade during most of 1863 and from August 1864 until the end of the war, he was never appointed a brigadier general by Confederate President Jefferson Davis or confirmed as a general officer by the Confederate Senate.

== Early life ==
James Hagan was born in County Tyrone, Ireland on June 17, 1822. His family moved to a farm near Philadelphia, Pennsylvania, when he was still at an early age. He was educated at Clermont Academy in Philadelphia. He moved to Alabama in 1837. His prosperous uncle, John Hagen of New Orleans, Louisiana, took him into the family business and set him up in Mobile, Alabama, to manage the Hagan business there.

Hagan served in Hays's Texas Rangers, a cavalry unit in Major General Zachary Taylor's army during the Mexican–American War. Hagan was recognized for his gallantry at the Battle of Monterrey. He was commissioned a captain in the 3rd U.S. Dragoons in 1848. He was discharged on July 31, 1848. After the war, he returned to Mobile, where he bought and subsequently managed a plantation instead of remaining in the family mercantile business.

In 1854, Hagan married Bettie Oliver, daughter of Alabama's attorney general.

== American Civil War service ==
At the beginning of the Civil War, James Hagan organized and was elected captain of a cavalry company for the Alabama Militia, the "Mobile Dragoons," which served on guard duty along the Gulf Coast. He transferred as Major to the 1st Mississippi Cavalry Regiment on October 26, 1861. The regiment fought at the Battle of Shiloh on April 6–7, 1862. Hagan led his men in a mounted charge at the Battle of Perryville, which was highly commended by his brigade commander, Brigadier General Joseph Wheeler.

Hagan was promoted to colonel of a new regiment, the 3rd Alabama Cavalry Regiment, on July 1, 1862. The regiment fought in all of the campaigns of the Army of Tennessee. In July 1863, Hagan was assigned to command Brigade 1 of Brigadier General William T. Martin's Division of the Cavalry Corps of the Army of Tennessee, which was Major General Joseph Wheeler's old brigade. During the spring and summer of 1863, the brigade screened the left front of General Braxton Bragg's army. Wheeler recommended that Hagan be promoted to brigadier general but Bragg blocked the promotion because he said Hagan was in a state of "dissipation", a reference to drunkenness or alcoholism. Hagan had been wounded near Franklin, Tennessee, in the winter of 1862 and again near Kingston, Tennessee, in November 1863. In November 1863, he resigned and returned to Mobile to recover from his wounds and his disappointment from not being promoted.

After he had recuperated, Hagan asked that his resignation be revoked. The resignation was revoked, and he returned to his regiment for the Atlanta campaign, where the regiment fought as infantry in the trenches. When Brigadier General William Wirt Adams was promoted to command of the Division, Hagan was assigned to permanent command of the brigade, consisting of 5 regiments and 1 battalion of Alabama cavalry. Hagan's brigade was part of Wheeler's force which opposed Major General William T. Sherman's March to the Sea and Carolinas campaign. Hagan was wounded again at the Battle of Monroe's Crossroads, near Kinston, North Carolina, on March 10, 1865, and again at Fayetteville, North Carolina, the next day.

Although Hagan was assigned as acting brigadier general in early 1865, he never received an official appointment from Jefferson Davis or confirmation by the Confederate Senate of an appointment as a general officer. Major General Wheeler later wrote that he had been told unofficially by Confederate States War Department officials that brigadier general commissions had been issued for Hagan, Henry Marshall Ashby and Moses Wright Hannon near the end of the war, but no such commissions ever were delivered.

== Aftermath ==
Hagan returned to Mobile after the war, but he was penniless since his fortune had been converted to Confederate money. He worked as manager of a plantation on the Alabama River in the 1870s and early 1880s. President Grover Cleveland appointed him crier of the United States District Court in Alabama in 1885.

James Hagan died on November 6, 1901, at Mobile, Alabama. He is buried in Magnolia Cemetery in Mobile.

== See also ==
- List of American Civil War Generals (Acting Confederate)
