= George Paul Harrison Sr. =

American politician (1813–1888)

- Born: October 19, 1813; Effingham County, Georgia
- Died: May 14, 1888 (aged 74); Chatham County, Georgia
- Burial place: Savannah, Georgia
- Military career
- Allegiance: Confederate States of America
- Branch: Georgia militia
- Service years: 1861–1862; 1864–1865
- Rank: Brigadier General
- Conflicts: American Civil War
- Other work: Georgia State representative, court clerk

George Paul Harrison Sr. (October 19, 1813 – May 14, 1888) was a brigadier general in the Georgia militia from 1856–1861, commander of the 1st Brigade in the Georgia State Troops and a colonel in Georgia's First Military District in 1864–1865 during the American Civil War (Civil War). He was a prisoner of war for several months near the end of the war.

George P. Harrison Sr. was a rice planter, brigadier general in the Georgia militia and member of the Georgia House of Representatives before the Civil War. After the war, Harrison was a state representative in 1865–1866, a delegate to the state constitutional convention, a clerk of the city court of Savannah, Georgia and clerk of the superior court of Chatham County, Georgia.

He was the father of George Paul Harrison Jr., a Confederate States Army colonel, who commanded a brigade late in the war and was later an Alabama State Senator and a two-term member of the United States House of Representatives from Alabama.

== Early life ==
George Paul Harrison Sr. was born in Effingham County, Georgia on October 19, 1813. He was the son of Colonel William Harrison, a colonel of Georgia militia in the War of 1812 and Mary (Keller) Harrison. Harrison was the father of George Paul Harrison Jr., a Confederate States Army colonel who commanded a brigade near the end of the Civil War and later was an Alabama state senator and a U.S. Representative from Alabama.

Harrison was a rice planter on his Savannah River plantation, Monteith, now a location within Port Wentworth, Georgia, which is within the Savannah metropolitan area. Before the Civil War, Harrison was a representative for Chatham County in the Georgia House of Representatives in 1842, 1849–1850, 1853–1854; and 1857–1860. He also became a brigadier general in the Georgia militia. He was a delegate to Democrat state party conventions in 1858 and 1860.

== American Civil War ==
After the outbreak of the Civil War, Georgia Governor Joseph E. Brown appointed Harrison a brigadier general of state troops to rank from September 14, 1861. Harrison was assigned to establish a training camp near Savannah and to organize the regiments for the new troops. Harrison did this, and led a force guarding the Georgia coast, during the winter of 1861–1862, after which his command was terminated.

Under a new militia law in 1864, Harrison was appointed colonel in charge of Georgia's First Military District with the duties of destroying whiskey stills and tracking down deserters. Soon, Harrison's command was required to oppose Sherman's March to the Sea. When they reached the Savannah area, Sherman's men pillaged Harrison's home and property at Montieth. In December 1864, Harrison was taken prisoner while visiting his devastated property. Harrison was released from prison before the end of the war but refused to take the oath of allegiance to the United States government.

== Later life ==
After the Civil War, Harrison returned to the Savannah area. He was elected to the Georgia House of Representatives for 1865–1866 and served as a delegate to the Georgia constitutional convention. He was elected court clerk of the City Court of Savannah, Georgia and clerk of the Superior Court of Chatham County, Georgia.

George Paul Harrison Sr. died at his home on his farm in Chatham County, Georgia near Savannah, Georgia on May 14, 1888. He is buried at Laurel Grove Cemetery, Savannah, Georgia.

== See also ==
- List of American Civil War generals (Acting Confederate)
