= Battle of Monroe's Crossroads =

Battle of the American Civil War

Coordinates: 35.1259°N 79.2032°W

- Part of the Carolinas campaign
Date	March 10, 1865
Location	Near Fayetteville, North Carolina
Result	Inconclusive

Belligerents
United States (Union)	Confederate States

Commanders and leaders
(United States) Hugh Judson Kilpatrick	(Confederate States of America) Wade Hampton (Confederate States of America) Joseph Wheeler

Units involved
Kilpatrick's Cavalry Division	Wheeler's Cavalry Division; Hampton's Cavalry Division

Strength
1,850	3,000

Casualties and losses
183	86
- Location within North Carolina

The Battle of Monroe's Crossroads (also known as the Battle of Fayetteville Road, and colloquially in the North as Kilpatrick's Shirttail Skedaddle) took place during the Carolinas campaign of the American Civil War in Cumberland County, North Carolina (now in Hoke County), on the grounds of the present day Fort Bragg. Involving about 4,500 men, it pitted mounted Confederate cavalry against dismounted Union cavalry. It was one of the last all-cavalry battles of the Civil War. The inconclusive fighting lasted for several hours early on the morning of March 10, 1865. The Confederate attack delayed the United States cavalry's movement toward Fayetteville, denying Brevet Maj. Gen. Hugh Judson Kilpatrick the honor of entering the town first.

== Battle ==
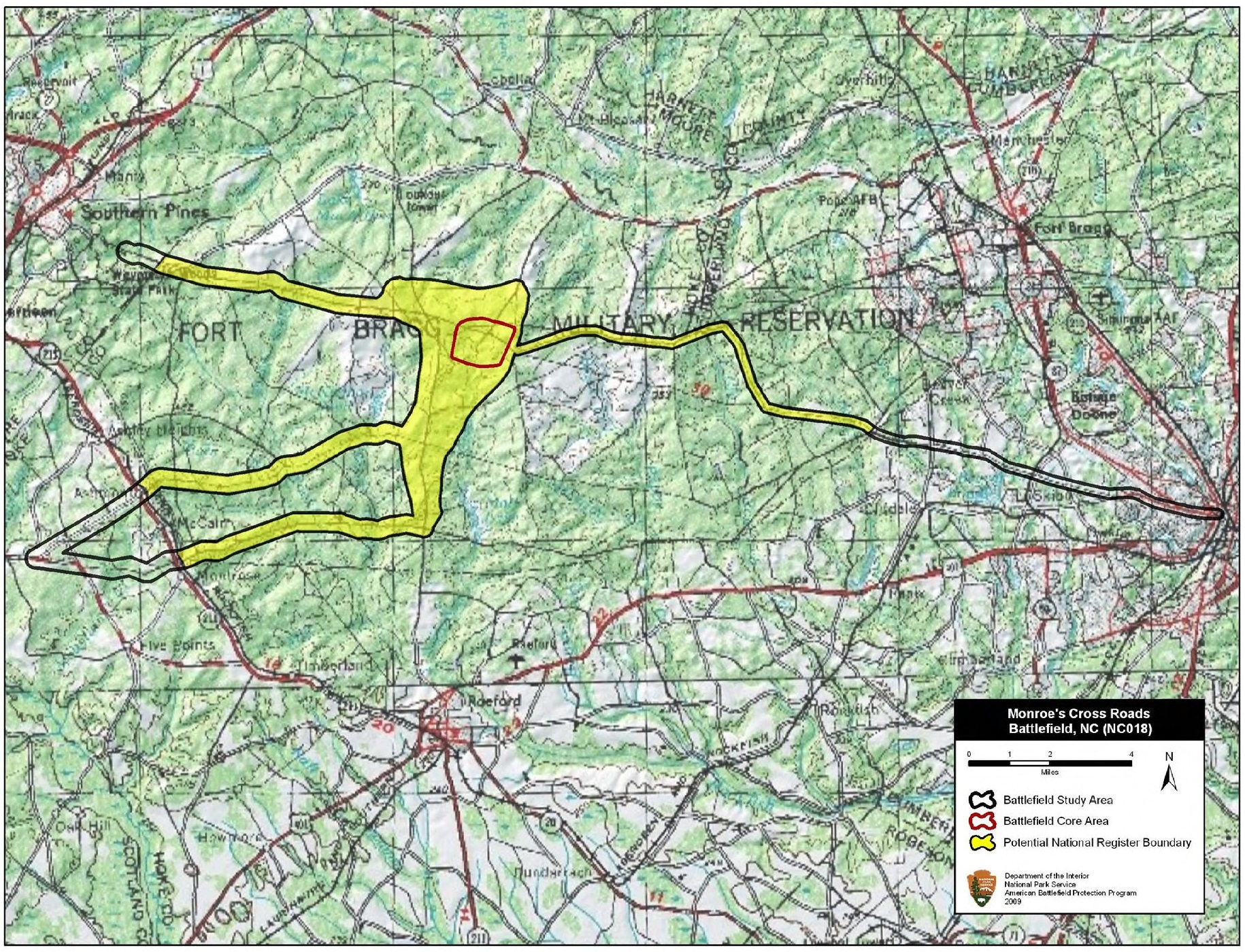
Map of Monroe's Crossroads Battlefield core and study areas by the American Battlefield Protection Program.

The main Confederate assault was at dawn and against a poorly guarded and sleeping Union camp. In command of the Confederate forces were Lt. Gen. Wade Hampton and Maj. Gen. Joseph Wheeler, who were operating together for the first time. One of the goals (not fulfilled) was the capture of Kilpatrick himself, using a small elite squadron of hand-picked troopers. Kilpatrick, ensconced with his mistress in a small log cabin near the farmhouse of Charles Monroe, managed to flee the chaotic scene in his nightshirt, hiding for a period in a nearby swamp before regaining his composure and reorganizing his troops. While initially routed, the Federal cavalry soon recovered and counterattacked, eventually pressuring the Confederates to withdraw from the camp. Anticipating the approach of Union infantry, the Confederate commanders ordered their troops to disengage from the action in the mid-morning. Hampton's cavalry finally withdrew in good order toward Fayetteville. Confederate Brig. Gen. Thomas Harrison, Brig. Gen. William Y.C. Humes, Col. and brigade commander James Hagan and Col. and brigade commander Moses W. Hannon were wounded during the battle. Brig. Gen. William W. Allen and Colonel and brigade commander Henry Marshall Ashby were injured when their horses were shot from under them.

== Aftermath ==
The Battle of Monroe's Crossroads gained the additional time needed for the Confederate infantry to conduct an organized crossing of the Cape Fear River at Fayetteville unmolested by the advancing Federals. With their troops and equipment east of the Cape Fear, the Confederates burned the bridges as Union forces entered the city.

The graves of several unidentified Union soldiers can still be seen today in the training area of Fort Bragg a few miles south of the Normandy Dropzone near the Coleman Impact Area. All visits must be approved by range control.
