= Battle of Athens (1864) =

Battle of the American Civil War

- Part of the American Civil War
Date	January 26, 1864
Location	Athens, Alabama 34.8033°N 86.9722°W
Result	Union victory

Belligerents
United States(Union)	(Confederate States of America) CSA (Confederacy)

Commanders and leaders
Emil Adams	Moses W. Hannon

Units involved
9th Illinois Mounted Infantry	1st Alabama Cavalry

Strength
~150	~700

Casualties and losses
~30	~50

The Battle of Athens was fought in Athens, Alabama (Limestone County, Alabama), on January 26, 1864, as part of the American Civil War. The Union force was a company under Captain Emil Adams from the 9th Illinois Mounted Infantry regiment. The Confederate force was the 1st Alabama Cavalry, under Lieutenant Colonel Moses W. Hannon.

On the morning of January 26, 1864, at around 4:00 a.m., ~700 Confederate cavalrymen attacked Athens, which was being held by a Union force of only 150. Even though the Union defenders had no fortifications and were outnumbered six to one, they were able to repulse the Confederate attack and force them into a retreat after a two-hour battle. The Union infantry effectively used the buildings of the town as protection, and the Confederate attackers realized that this kind of urban warfare was too time-consuming and unlikely to succeed before nearby reinforcements might arrive.
