= Peter A. S. McGlashan =

Peter Alexander Selkirk McGlashan
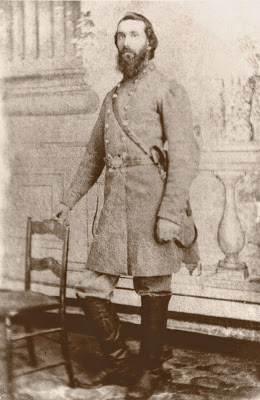
- Col. McGlashan
- Born: May 19, 1831; Edinburgh, Scotland
- Died: June 13, 1908 (aged 77); Isle of Hope, Georgia, US
- Burial place: Laurel Grove Cemetery; Savannah, Georgia
- Spouse: Anne Willis McGlashan (nee Seixas)
- Military career
- Allegiance: Nicaragua; Confederate States of America
- Branch: Walker's Army; Confederate States Army
- Service years: 1856–1857 (Nicaragua); 1861–1865 (CSA)
- Rank: Colonel (CSA); Brigadier General (unconfirmed)
- Unit: 29th Georgia Infantry
- Commands: 50th Georgia Infantry; Bryan's Brigade / Kershaw's Div I Corps / Army of Northern Virginia
- Conflicts: Filibuster War; American Civil War: 2nd Battle of Manassas; Battle of South Mountain; Battle of Sharpsburg (w); Battle of Fredericksburg; Battle of Chancellorsville; Battle of Gettysburg; Chattanooga campaign; Siege of Knoxville; Battle of the Wilderness; Battle of Spotsylvania Court House; Valley Campaigns of 1864; Battle of Cedar Creek (w); Siege of Petersburg (w); Appomattox Campaign; Battle of Sayler's Creek (POW)
- Other work: mayor, store owner

Peter Alexander Selkirk McGlashan (May 19, 1831 – June 13, 1908) was a Confederate officer during the American Civil War. Promoted to the rank of brigadier in April 1865, he was the last appointed general of the Confederacy.

== Early life ==
Peter A.S. McGlashan was born in Edinburgh, Scotland on May 19, 1831. He was the son of James McGlashan, a veteran of the Napoleonic Wars and Waterloo. His grandfather, namesake Peter McGlashan, was the last chief of Clan McGlashan (now a sept of Clan McIntosh). The McGlashan family immigrated to Savannah, Georgia in 1848. A year later eighteen years old Peter participated in the California Gold Rush, but returned without much success. In 1856 he joined Walker's army and fought in the Filibuster War in Nicaragua. When the war ended he returned and settled in Thomasville, Georgia; opening a store.

== Civil war ==
When the American Civil War began in 1861 McGlashan joined the Confederate States Army as a private in the 29th Georgia Infantry Regiment and quickly was promoted to sergeant. On March 4, 1862, he was commissioned a 1st lieutenant in the just raised 50th Georgia Infantry. Initially serving on the coastal defenses at Savannah, the regiment was transferred to Richmond, Virginia, during the Seven Days Battles. Afterwards they joined the Army of Northern Virginia and became a part of Gen. James Longstreet's First Corps – an assignment the regiment would keep for the duration of the war.

McGlashan gained combat experience during the campaigns in Northern Virginia and Maryland; and in October 1862 McGlashan was made captain of Company E. In February 1863 he was promoted to the rank of major. The 50th Georgia belonged to the detachment of the corps that participated in the Battle of Chancellorsville.

At the Battle of Gettysburg the regiment, having 302 men present for duty, was in the brigade of Paul J. Semmes in the division of Lafayette McLaws. On the second day, July 2, 1863, the brigade initially constituted the divisional reserve. During McLaw's assault in the afternoon through Semmes' Brigade was called forward to close the gap between the other brigades in front of the Wheatfield; the 50th taking an exposed position ahead of the brigade's left. The brigade then slugged it out against elements of Caldwell's division of Hancock's Corps before finally being repulsed. When the present commander of the 50th Georgia, Lt. Col. Kearse, was wounded McGlashan temporarily took command of the regiment until he was superseded later that day. He was subsequently promoted to lieutenant colonel. At Gettysburg the records of the regimental losses are unclear and conflicting; the most detailed however give the losses as 16 killed, 62 wounded and 14 missing. When the regimental commander, Col. William R. Manning, received a medical discharge on July 31 McGlashan was chosen to be his successor and was promoted to colonel.

When General Longstreet took his corps westwards to join the Army of Tennessee McGlashan and the 50th went with him. The brigade, now under command of Goode Bryan, was too late for the Battle of Chickamauga but in time for the ensuing campaigns of Chattanooga and Knoxville. Returning to the east in the winter of 1864 they fought in the Overland Campaign before the division, now under Joseph B. Kershaw, was dispatched with Jubal Early for the Valley Campaigns of 1864. In April McGlashan was joined by one of fellow Scotsmen and relatives, Andrew McGlashan, who was appointed a lieutenant and adjutant of the regiment. Andrew was captured in the Battle of Cedar Creek and kept as prisoner at Fort Delaware until released in July 1865. Col. McGlashan himself was wounded at Cedar Creek, but recovered quickly and afterwards served in the Petersburg Campaign. He gained further command experience over the year when he was occasionally assigned to command both the 50th and the 10th Georgia Infantry regiments. His brigade was commanded by James P. Simms since early 64.

In January and February 1865 McGlashan commanded the brigade in Simms's absence, but returned to his regiment for the Appomattox Campaign. At the Battle of Sayler's Creek on April 6 he became a Prisoner of War. Some days earlier President Jefferson Davis, priorly to fleeing from Richmond, had signed McGlashan's promotion to brigadier general; but it was not delivered or confirmed by Congress in time. This promotion makes him the last appointed general of the Confederacy. He was brought to the Old Capitol Prison in Washington, D.C., where he was during President Lincoln's assassination. Afterwards he was held in the prison camp on Johnson's Island, Ohio until he was released on July 25, 1865.

== Later life ==
McGlashan again returned to Thomasville and was elected mayor in early 1866. He was responsible for the forming of the fire department, which he utilised to keep up order while the city was under martial law and during the early reconstruction. Likewise he utilised the marshall to bring in taxes and managed to stabilize the city finances. He supported the local militia, becoming captain of the Thomasville Guard in 1874. He moved back to Savannah in 1885 and became active in United Confederate Veterans; leading the Savannah camp (#756) and becoming its president for Georgia after the death of fellow General Clement A. Evans. His wife Anne Willis Seixas McGlashan, a great-grandniece of Gen. Nathanael Greene, died on 1905. Peter McGlashan died on a trip to the Isle of Hope near Savannah when he drowned close to the beach on June 13, 1908. He was interred on the family plot on Laurel Grove Cemetery next to his wife.

== See also ==
- 50th Georgia Infantry

== Resources ==
- Tucker, Phillip T. (2014). Burnside's Bridge: The Climactic Struggle of the 2nd and 20th Georgia at Antietam Creek. Mechanicsburg, PA: Stackpole Books. ISBN 978-0-8117-4536-9.
- United Confederate Veterans, Georgia Division. Official Programme and Guide Book, Reunion (Year Unknown), Georgia Division (2013 Reprint ed.). London: Forgotten Books.
- Eicher, John H.; Eicher, David (2001). Civil War High Commands. Stanford, CA: Stanford University Press. ISBN 0-8047-3641-3.
- "50th Georgia Infantry Regiment". The Civil War in the East.
- Smith, Carl (1998). Gettysburg 1863: High tide of the Confederacy. Oxford, UK: Osprey Publishing. ISBN 1-8553-2953-0.
- Vanderslice, John M. (1897). A History of the Gettysburg Battle-Field Memorial Association. PA: Pennsylvania State Press. ISBN 0-2710-4636-8.
- Young, Jesse Bowman (1913). The Battle of Gettysburg: A Comprehensive Narrative. Ann Arbor, MI: University of Michigan.
- "Report 301". The War of the Rebellion: A Compilation of the Official Records of the Union and Confederate Armies. Vol. XL, Part 1. 1892.
- Cook, Jacquelyn (2009). The Greenwood Legacy. Memphis, TN: BelleBooks. ISBN 978-1-9356-6145-0.
- "Body of M'Glashan is laid to rest". Atlanta Georgian and News. 15 June 1908.
