= James Harvey Carson =

American politician

- Born: February 11, 1808; Frederick County, Virginia
- Died: January 13, 1884 (aged 75); Leesburg, Virginia
- Burial place: Frederick County, Virginia
- Military career
- Allegiance: Confederate States of America
- Branch: Virginia militia
- Service years: 1861–1862
- Rank: Brigadier General
- Conflicts: American Civil War

James Harvey Carson (February 11, 1808 – January 13, 1884) was a brigadier general in the Virginia militia, who served along with the Confederate States Army in northwestern Virginia at various times during 1861 and early 1862 in the American Civil War (Civil War). Carson's men were part of Stonewall Jackson's force that moved to take the town of Bath, later Berkeley Springs, now in West Virginia, on January 3, 1862.

Carson left the military on February 1, 1862 to go back to and become president of the Virginia State Senate. He returned to farming in 1864 and was active in law and real estate in Frederick County and in Leesburg in Loudoun County, Virginia after the war.

Prior to the Civil War, Carson had been an assistant teacher, a farmer, a lawyer, a colonel in the Virginia militia in 1837, and a member of the Virginia General Assembly, first in the Virginia House of Delegates from 1844 to 1847, then in the Virginia State Senate from 1859 to 1864.

== Early life ==
James Harvey Carson was born at Pleasant Green in Frederick County, Virginia, near Winchester, Virginia, on February 11, 1808. His parents were Simon Carson, a farmer and militia officer, and Martha Williams, daughter of the first owner of Pleasant Green.

Carson was an assistant teacher at Winchester Academy when he was 18 years old. He became a prominent lawyer at Winchester, Virginia and a farmer. He was elected a colonel in the Virginia militia in 1837. He was a state representative in the Virginia House of Delegates from 1844 to 1847 and a Virginia State Senator from 1859 to 1864. In 1859, Carson became a brigadier general of the 16th Brigade of the Virginia militia.

== American Civil War service ==
James Harvey Carson's brigade was called into service at the outset of the Civil War to guard Harper's Ferry and the Shenandoah Valley. Carson and many of his men remained with the Virginia militia when many Virginia troops were transferred to the Confederate Army on June 8, 1861. They remained in the valley when the forces of then Brigadier General Joseph E. Johnston moved to join those of Brigadier General Pierre G. T. Beauregard at the First Battle of Bull Run.

Carson commanded the 3rd Division of the Virginia militia in the northern Shenandoah Valley in August 1861. After a quiet period, Carson's men were called for duty in November 1861 along with the brigades of James Boggs and Gilbert S. Meem.

In early January, Jackson moved against the Union held towns of Romney and Bath (Berkeley Springs) and occupied those towns. On January 3, 1862, Jackson detached Carson's brigade in order to attack Bath from the west while Jackson's force attacked from the east. By the time the militia arrived at the town, Jackson had already driven out the Union force. Carson's brigade was left to occupy the town and set up winter quarters while Jackson moved on to take Romney.

== Later life ==
Although Carson was praised for his intelligence and a number of admirable qualities, he apparently was not an outstanding military commander. He left the field voluntarily on February 1, 1862 when he returned to his Virginia Senate seat and was elected president of the Virginia Senate. He resigned from Virginia Senate in 1864 and returned to farming.

Carson practiced law and became active in real estate work in Frederick County after the war. Later he moved his work to Leesburg, Virginia in Loudoun County.

James Harvey Carson died at Leesburg, Virginia on January 13, 1884. He was buried in the Carson graveyard at Pleasant Green in Frederick County, Virginia.

== See also ==
- List of American Civil War generals (Acting Confederate)
