= George P. Harrison Jr. =

American politician (1841–1922)

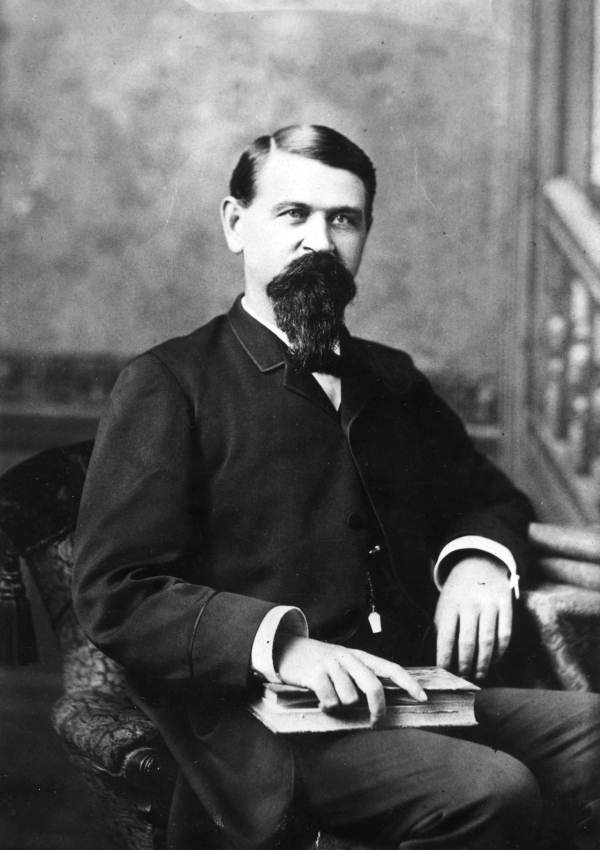

Member of the U.S. House of Representatives from Alabama's 3rd district
- In office November 6, 1894 – March 3, 1897
- Preceded by: Charles Pelham
- Succeeded by: Henry D. Clayton Jr.

President of the Alabama Senate
- In office 1882-1884

Member of the Alabama Senate
- In office 1878-1884

Personal details
- Born: George Paul Harrison; March 19, 1841 Savannah, Georgia
- Died: July 17, 1922 (aged 81) Opelika, Alabama
- Resting place: Rosemere Cemetery (Opelika, Alabama)
- Party: Democratic

Military service
- Allegiance: Confederate States of America
- Branch/service: Confederate States Army
- Years of service: 1862–65
- Rank: Acting Brigadier General (CSA)
- Battles/wars: American Civil War: Battle of Bentonville

George Paul Harrison (March 19, 1841 – July 17, 1922) was a U.S. Representative from Alabama.

== Early life and education ==
Born at "Monteith Plantation," 12 miles from Savannah, Georgia, George Paul Harrison, attended Effingham Academy and the Georgia Military Institute at Marietta, Georgia. His father, George Paul Harrison, was a wealthy planter, state legislator and brigadier general of Georgia militia during the American Civil War. His mother was Thurza Adelaide (Guinn) Harrison.

== Military service ==
On January 3, 1861, at the onset of tensions which would lead to the Civil War later that April, Harrison entered the Confederate States Army as second lieutenant of the First Georgia Regulars. He later participated in the seizure of Fort Pulaski. In recognition of his actions in that battle, Governor Joseph E. Brown appointed Harrison as military commandant of the Georgia Military Institute, until he graduated in May 1861. Harrison then returned to the army and was successively promoted over the course of the war to first lieutenant, major, colonel, and acting brigadier general. On May 15, 1862, he was elected colonel of the 32nd Georgia Infantry Regiment. He commanded Fort Johnson, Morris Island and John's Island, where he was wounded twice, and reinforced Fort Wagner during the July 18, 1863, battle. He commanded a brigade at the Battle of Olustee, which resulted in the defeat of Federal forces. During the battle, the brigade suffered official casualties of 50 killed, 406 wounded and four missing. After reaching the rank of Brigadier General, Harrison commanded a brigade of A.P. Stewart's corps. At the time, he was 23 years old, the youngest Brigadier-General in the Confederate Army. During the course of the war, Harrison was wounded three times. The last time at the Battle of Olustee, where a horse was shot out from under him. Harrison commanded a prison camp at Florence, South Carolina, in late 1864, where 25,000 Union prisoners were interned. He was commended by Union prisoners for his humane treatment of them. During the war, Harrison undertook the command responsibility of brigadier general, leading a brigade during the Carolinas campaign and at the Battle of Bentonville, and elsewhere. Although he received a provisional appointment to that rank, it was never officially confirmed before the end of hostilities.

== Legal and political career ==
After the war, Harrison moved to Alabama in 1865, where he studied law. He served as commandant of cadets at Auburn University. He was admitted to the bar and commenced practice in Auburn, Alabama, and also worked as a planter. He served as member of the constitutional convention of Alabama in 1875. Harrison served in the State senate between 1878 and 1884 and was its president in 1882–1884. He served as delegate to the Democratic National Convention in 1892.

Harrison was elected as a Democrat to the Fifty-third Congress to fill the vacancy caused by the resignation of William C. Oates. He was reelected to the Fifty-fourth Congress and served from November 6, 1894, to March 3, 1897.

== Later years and legacy ==
After his final term in Congress, he resumed the practice of law in Opelika, Alabama. He served as delegate to the State constitutional convention in 1901. Harrison again served in the Alabama State senate in 1900 and 1902. Harrison served as general counsel for the Western Railway of Alabama and as Division counsel for the Central of Georgia Railway. He was major general of the Alabama Division of the United Confederate Veterans.

Of Harrison's visit to the Tuskegee Institute, Booker T Washington said: "I want to say again how very much we all appreciate the visit of [former Confederate] General George Paul Harrison to Tuskegee. We all realize more and more that men like him are the true friends of our race, and that any monument that will keep the fine character of such heroes before the public will prove helpful to both races in the South." Washington, Booker T., Papers Volume 13:14-15. University of Chicago Press. Page 64.

Forwarded by Teresa Roane, United Daughter's of the Confederacy, African American

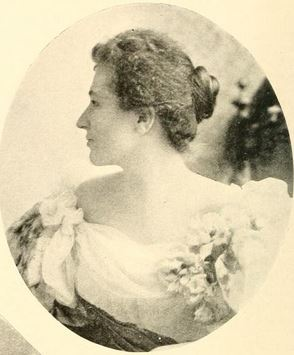
Mary A. Harrison

Mary A. Harrison, the daughter of Hon. George P. Harrison, was born in Lee county, Alabama. She was graduated with first honors from the Wesleyan Female College, at Macon, Georgia, afterwards taking a musical course at the Cincinnati Conservatory, which was supplemented by two years' study in New York City with Ernani. Miss Harrison inherited her fine musical talent from her mother. Her voice is well adapted for sacred and dramatic music, and she was requested to sing at leading Washington churches. Harrison resided with her father at the Riggs, and was a prominent figure in the numerous receptions given there.

George Paul Harrison, died in Opelika, Alabama, on July 17, 1922. He was interred in Rosemere Cemetery.

U.S. House of Representatives
Preceded by William C. Oates	Member of the U.S. House of Representatives from Alabama's 3rd congressional district November 6, 1894 – March 3, 1897	Succeeded by Henry D. Clayton
