= Gilbert S. Meem =

American politician

Gilbert Simrall Meem

Member of the Virginia Senate from the Shenandoah and Page counties district
- In office January 1871 – January 1875

Member of the Virginia House of Delegates from the Shenandoah County, Virginia district
- In office January, 1852 – January 1854

Personal details
- Born: October 5, 1824 Abingdon, Virginia
- Died: June 10, 1908 (aged 83) Seattle, Washington
- Resting place: Seattle, Washington
- Party: Democratic
- Spouse: Nanny Rose Garland
- Profession: farmer, politician, bureaucrat

Military service
- Allegiance: Confederate States of America
- Branch/service: Virginia militia
- Years of service: 1861–1862
- Rank: Brigadier General
- Battles/wars: American Civil War

Gilbert Simrall Meem (October 5, 1824 – June 10, 1908) was a Virginia farmer and politician who served in both houses of the Virginia General Assembly, as well as became a brigadier general in the Virginia militia and served along with the Confederate States Army in northwestern Virginia and what became West Virginia during the American Civil War. Meem's men participated in Stonewall Jackson's attacks on the towns of Romney and Bath, later Berkeley Springs, now in West Virginia in early January 1862. After the brigade went into winter quarters in Martinsburg, now West Virginia, Meem resigned his commission on February 1, 1862, then served in the Shenandoah County, Virginia, local government during the war and in the Virginia Senate following the war, before moving to Seattle, Washington, and becoming its postmaster in the administration of President Grover Cleveland, where he became a prominent citizen before his death.

== Early life ==
Gilbert S. Meem was born in Abingdon, Virginia, on October 5, 1824, to the former Eliza Russell and her husband John Gaw Meem, a Lynchburg, Virginia, banker. John Gaw Meem owned 20 enslaved people in Lynchburg, Campbell County, Virginia in the 1850 Federal census, ranging from 65, 55 and 40 year old black men and a 40 year old mulatto woman to two girl and one boy year-old babies.

Gilbert Meem attended Edgehill Seminary, a prep school for Princeton University, but quit school to manage the Steenbergen estate near Mount Airy, Virginia, which his father had purchased in 1841. He married Nannie Rose Garland, which resulted in future Confederate States Army Brigadier General Samuel Garland and Lieutenant General James Longstreet becoming relatives.

== Career ==
Meem was an accomplished livestock breeder as well as a planter. He won election as a Democrat alongside (?) and served in the Virginia House of Delegates in 1852–1854 before the pair lost their bid for re-election to the men then had defeated in 1851.

== American Civil War service ==
Gilbert S. Meem was a brigadier general of the 7th Brigade in the 3rd Division of Brigadier General James Harvey Carson in the Virginia militia at the outbreak of the Civil War. Along with Carson's men, Meem's brigade was part of the garrison at Harpers Ferry after it was captured by the pro-Confederate Virginia force in April 1861. Meem's brigade guarded Winchester, Virginia, when then Brigadier General Joseph E. Johnston's men moved to support Confederate forces at the First Battle of Bull Run. At least part of Meem's brigade remained on duty throughout 1861.

In November 1861, Meem's men were called by Stonewall Jackson for training at Winchester, Virginia, and duty in the Valley District. In early January, Jackson moved against the Union held towns of Romney and Bath (Berkeley Springs) and occupied those towns. Meem's men advanced with Jackson's main body. They performed poorly at Bath, falling back under fire and failing to block the Union force's route of retreat as Jackson drove them out of town from the other side. After Jackson took possession of the two main towns in the area Meem's men were sent south and east to Martinsburg, Virginia, now West Virginia, to guard the rear of Jackson's army and to go into winter quarters.

On February 1, 1862, Meem resigned his commission. The resignation appears to have been under pressure after General Robert E. Lee received reports that Meem's habits and daily condition, apparently alcohol abuse, made him unfit for command. Meem returned to his estate and also held various positions in the Shenandoah County, Virginia government for the remainder of the war.

== Later life ==
After the war, Meem continued to manage his estate Shenandoah County's Mount Airy area. He received recognition for his breeding operations which helped introduce and improve fine cattle and sheep into the Shenandoah Valley. Meem won election to the Virginia State Senate in 1870, and represented Shenandoah and adjoining Page County from 1871 to 1875. He published a booklet titled: Catalogue of short horned cattle, on exhibition and for sale at the National Fair, Washington, D.C. New Market, Henkel and Co., printers, 1888, OCLC 5953903.

In 1892, Meem sold his Mount Airy property and moved to Seattle, Washington. President Grover Cleveland appointed him postmaster of Seattle after his move. Meem served in that office until 1899, becoming a well-known citizen of the city.

Gilbert S. Meem died on June 10, 1908, in Seattle. He is buried in Lake View Cemetery at Seattle. His son, Gilbert S. Meem Jr., had died no later than May 29, 1909, and was buried in the same cemetery.

== See also ==
- List of American Civil War generals (Acting Confederate)
