= David Bullock Harris =

Confederate States Army colonel (1814–1864)

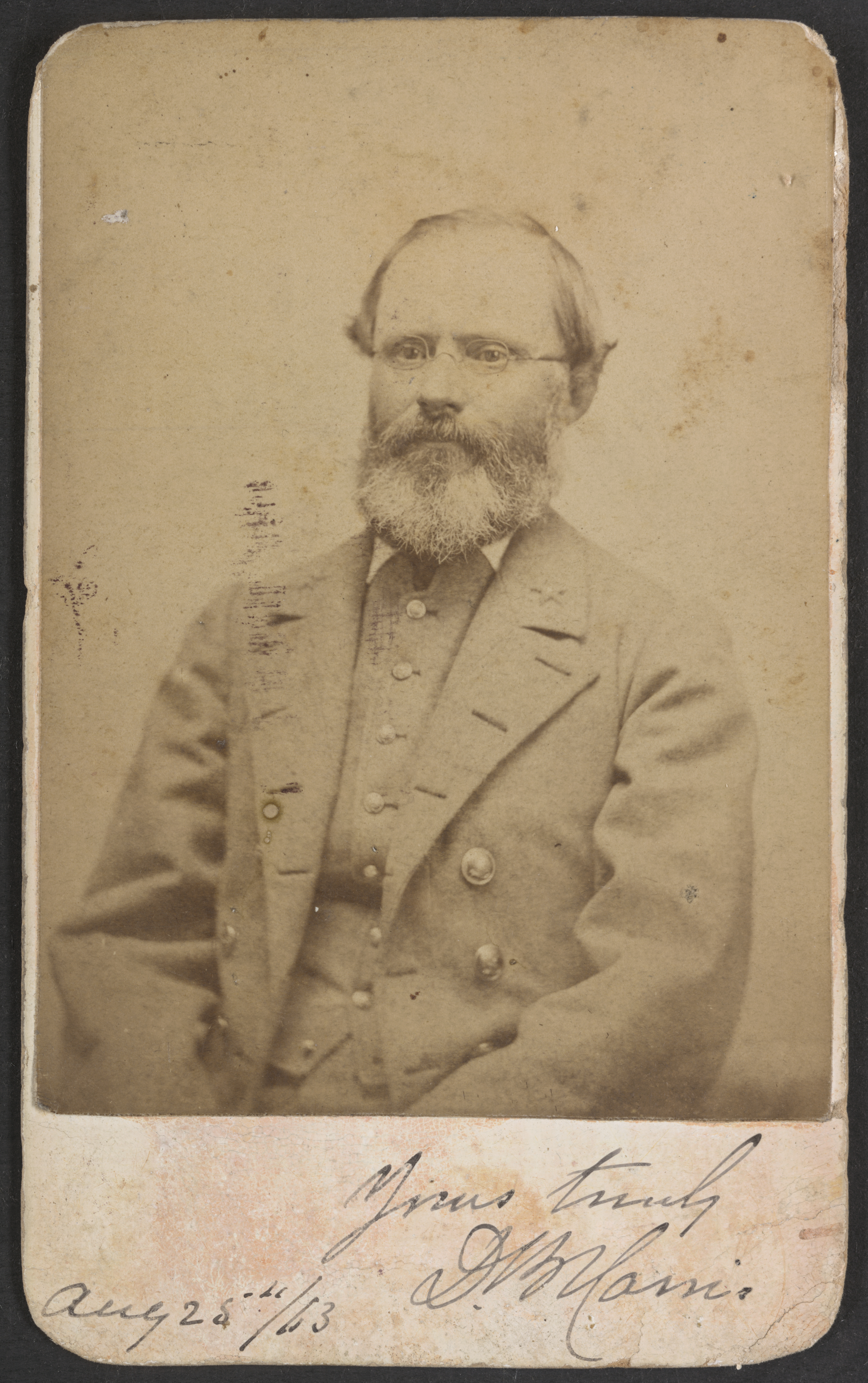
- David Bullock Harris in 1863
- Born: September 8, 1814; Louisa County, Virginia
- Died: October 10, 1864 (aged 50); Summerville, South Carolina
- Burial place: Richmond, Virginia
- Military career
- Allegiance: United States of America; Confederate States of America
- Branch: United States Army; Confederate States Army
- Service years: 1833–1835 (USA); 1861–1864 (CSA)
- Rank: Second Lieutenant (USA); Colonel (CSA)
- Unit: 1st U.S. Artillery
- Conflicts: American Civil War

David Bullock Harris (September 28, 1814 – October 10, 1864) was a colonel in the Confederate States Army during the American Civil War (Civil War). Harris served as an engineer, mostly under the command of General Pierre Gustave Toutant Beauregard. Harris planned and constructed the defenses of Centreville, Virginia, Fort Pillow, Island Number Ten, Vicksburg, Mississippi, Charleston, South Carolina, and Petersburg, Virginia, in the siege of that city's opening phase. He died of yellow fever at Summerville, South Carolina, on October 10, 1864.

== Early life ==
David Bullock Harris was born at Frederick's Hall (now spelled Fredericks Hall) in Louisa County, Virginia, on September 28, 1814, and grew up at Gardner's Crossroads (Gardners Crossroads) in Louisa County. His parents were Frederick and Catherine Snelson (Smith) Harris. Frederick Harris was a U.S. Army captain during the War of 1812 and later was president of the Louisa Railroad, which became the Virginia Central Railroad.

David B. Harris graduated from the United States Military Academy in 1833. He served for two years in the artillery branch of the U.S. Army and as an engineering instructor at the U.S. Military Academy. He resigned from the U.S. Army as a second lieutenant in 1835. For two years, he worked as an engineer for the James River and Kanawha Canal Company. Thereafter, he did railroad survey work. By 1845, he had acquired "Woodville", a Goochland County plantation, where he was a tobacco farmer and where he resided at the outbreak of the Civil War.

Harris's wife was the former Louisa Knight.

== American Civil War ==
David Bullock Harris was appointed a captain of engineers in the Virginia militia on May 2, 1861. By July, he was serving on the staff of Confederate Army Brigadier General Philip St. George Cocke. He was engaged at the First Battle of Bull Run on July 21, 1861. Thereafter, Harris was assigned to the staff of General P. G. T. Beauregard.

Harris planned Confederate defenses of Centreville, Virginia; Fort Pillow; Island Number Ten; Vicksburg, Mississippi; and Charleston, South Carolina. He was promoted to captain of Confederate engineers on February 15, 1862, to major on October 3, 1862, to lieutenant colonel on May 5, 1863, and to colonel on October 8, 1863. After Beauregard took command at Charleston for the second time, Harris worked constantly to improve the fortifications, often visiting troops in exposed and dangerous positions to design improvements. These defenses proved too formidable for besieging Union forces to overcome. After traveling with Beauregard to Virginia, where he planned defenses at Petersburg in the summer of 1864, Harris returned to Charleston and the post of chief engineer of the Department of South Carolina. He soon died of yellow fever though at Summerville, South Carolina, on October 10, 1864, having just turned 50.

== Aftermath ==
Harris had been recommended for promotion to brigadier general, and Confederate President Jefferson Davis verbally promised the promotion to him shortly before Harris died. The promotion had not gone through before Harris died, though some early lists of Confederate generals showed Harris as a brigadier.

David Bullock Harris is buried in Hollywood Cemetery (Richmond, Virginia).

== See also ==
- List of American Civil War generals (Acting Confederate)
