= James P. Simms =

American brigadier general (1837–1887)

James Phillip Simms
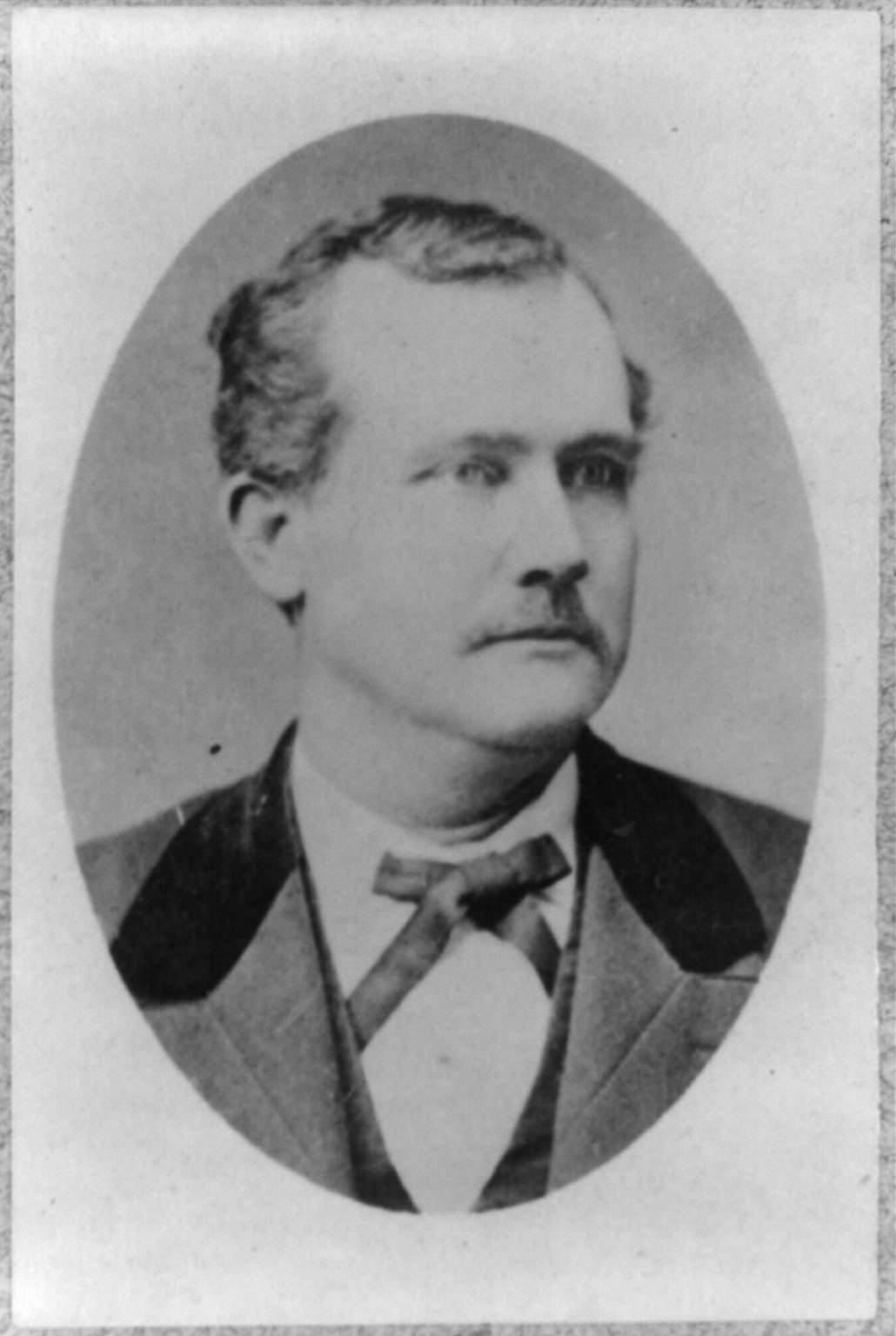
- Born: January 16, 1837; Covington, Georgia, U.S.
- Died: May 30, 1887 (aged 50); Covington, Georgia, U.S.
- Burial place: Covington, Georgia, U.S.
- Military career
- Allegiance: Confederate States of America
- Branch: Confederate States Army
- Service years: 1862–1865
- Rank: Brigadier General
- Conflicts: American Civil War

James Phillip Simms (January 16, 1837 – May 30, 1887) was a Confederate States Army brigadier general during the American Civil War (Civil War). He was a lawyer in Covington, Georgia, before and after the war. He served two non-consecutive terms in the Georgia legislature after the war.

== Early life ==
James P. Simms was born January 16, 1837, at Covington, Georgia. He was a lawyer and a brigadier general in the Georgia militia before the Civil War. Not much else is known about his life before the Civil War.

== American Civil War service ==
James P. Simms started his Confederate States Army service as a second lieutenant C.S.A. with the 6th Georgia Militia on October 21, 1861. By April 1862, he was a first lieutenant with the 42nd Georgia Infantry Regiment. On August 20, 1862, he was promoted to captain. On September 23, 1862, he became a major of the 53rd Georgia Infantry Regiment and on October 8, 1862, after the resignation of Colonel Leonard T. Doyal, he was promoted to colonel.

Simms commanded his regiment at the Battle of Fredericksburg and the Battle of Salem Church, where they captured the flag of the 2nd Rhode Island Infantry Regiment. The regiment fought at the Battle of Gettysburg, especially on July 2, 1863.

The regiment went with Lieutenant General James Longstreet's corps to the Western Theater and fought in the Chattanooga campaign and Knoxville Campaign. On November 29, 1863, Simms was wounded at the Battle of Fort Sanders (former Confederate Fort Loudon) at Knoxville, Tennessee.

Although the Eichers show Simms as next serving between September 30, 1864, and April 6, 1865, as commander of a brigade in Kershaw's division of the I Corps of the Army of Northern Virginia, Warner and Sifakis say he commanded his regiment during the Overland Campaign and Sifakis says he commanded Brigadier General Goode Bryan's old brigade from June 2, 1864, because Goode Bryan relinquished command due to ill health on that date, until April 1865 except for a short period of time in early 1865. In the fall of 1864, Simms was transferred to the Shenandoah Valley in Major General Joseph Brevard Kershaw's division. In command of Goode Bryan's old brigade after Bryan's resignation on September 20, 1864, Simms commanded the brigade in the Valley Campaigns of 1864, distinguishing himself at the Battle of Cedar Creek.

During this period, on December 8, 1864, Simms was promoted to brigadier general. Returning from the Shenandoah Valley, Simms served during the Siege of Petersburg that winter.

After the Confederates evacuated Richmond, Virginia and Petersburg, Virginia, Simms was captured at the Battle of Sayler's Creek on April 6, 1865. Simms was paroled from the Union prisoner of war facility at Fort Warren (Massachusetts) on July 24, 1865.

== Aftermath ==
Simms returned to Covington, Georgia, after the war. He resumed his law practice and served in the Georgia legislature in 1865–1866 and for the term starting in 1877. James Phillip Simms died on May 30, 1887, at Covington, Georgia, and was buried in Southview Cemetery at Covington.

== See also ==
- List of American Civil War generals (Confederate)
