= William Y. C. Humes =

William Young Conn Humes
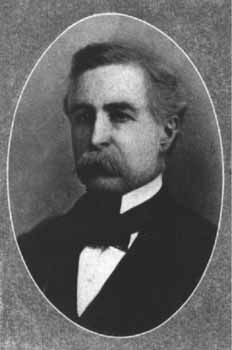
- Born: May 1, 1830; Abingdon, Virginia
- Died: September 11, 1883 (aged 53); Huntsville, Alabama
- Burial place: Elmwood Cemetery, Memphis, Tennessee
- Military career
- Allegiance: United States; Confederate States of America
- Branch: Confederate States Army
- Service years: 1861–65
- Rank: Brigadier General
- Conflicts: American Civil War

Signature
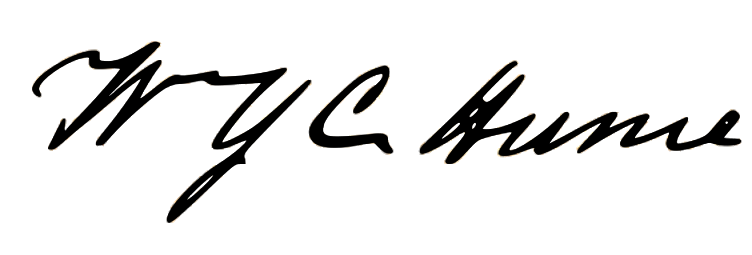

William Young Conn Humes (May 1, 1830 – September 11, 1883) was an American educator, lawyer, and soldier. He served as a Confederate cavalry general during the American Civil War, in which he was wounded twice, and fought mainly in the Western Theater of the conflict. Afterward Humes resumed practicing law until his death.

== Early life and career ==
William Y.C. Humes was born in 1830 in the town of Abingdon, located in Washington County, Virginia. He was a son of John Newton Humes and his wife Jance Conn White, and he was a cousin of Thomas W. Humes, a lawyer and politician. Because his father had lost his fortune, William Humes needed to borrow money to finish his initial education.

Humes entered the Virginia Military Institute (VMI) on November 20, 1848, and graduated second in a class of 29 cadets on July 4, 1851, making him a "distinguished graduate." While attending VMI, Humes was a classmate of Alfred J. Vaughan, who also would serve as a Confederate general in the Civil War.

After graduating, Humes became a teacher to pay off his financial debts. In 1854 he married another resident of Abingdon named Margaret Preston White, with whom he had two sons. He then relocated to Knoxville, Tennessee, where he read law and became a lawyer. In 1858 he moved to Memphis and began a successful law practice. Humes was still a lawyer in Memphis when the American Civil War began.

== Civil War service ==
When the Civil War began in 1861, Humes chose to follow his home states and the Confederate cause. On March 16 he was appointed a first lieutenant in the Confederate Regular Artillery, on May 13 he was commissioned a first lieutenant in the volunteer forces, and that June was promoted to captain of artillery. Humes was posted to the Confederate fortifications protecting the Mississippi River near New Madrid, and was given command of the artillery guns there. He was still part the garrison when it surrendered, and was captured by Union forces on April 7. Humes was imprisoned at Johnson's Island located in Sandusky Bay in Ohio, until he was exchanged in September 1862.

1863–64 Atlanta campaign

On March 15, 1863, Humes was promoted to the rank of major and assigned to command the artillery of Maj. Gen. Joseph Wheeler's cavalry corps. He participated in the Battle of Farmington on October 7, and was wounded in a foot during the fight. Upon recovery, Humes was promoted to brigadier general on November 16. He was then given brigade command in Wheeler's cavalry, leaving the artillery service. He also fought during the Battle of Lookout Mountain and the Battle of Missionary Ridge of the Chattanooga campaign in the fall of 1863.

Humes participated in the Atlanta campaign of late 1863 and into the summer of 1864, and fought at the Battle of Brown's Mill on July 30, 1864. He then fought during Wheeler's 1864 Raid into Tennessee that fall, now leading a cavalry division. He then resisted Sherman's March to the Sea in late 1864, and fought during the Battle of Buck Head Creek on November 28. After his wife Margaret died, Humes married Sallie Elder in 1864, and the couple would have four children together. Humes then participated in the Carolinas campaign of 1865, and fought during the Confederate victory at the Battle of Monroe's Crossroads on March 10, where he was wounded in a leg, and he also fought in the Battle of Bentonville from March 19–21. Near the end of the American Civil War, Humes surrendered with Gen. Joseph E. Johnston on April 26, although there is no record of an individual parole or pardon.

== Postbellum career and death ==
After the war ended, Humes returned to Memphis, Tennessee, and resumed his career as a lawyer. He later relocated to Alabama and again practiced law. Humes died there in Huntsville in 1883, and his body was brought back to Memphis where it was buried in Elmwood Cemetery.

== See also ==
- List of American Civil War generals (Confederate)
