= Second Battle of Corinth order of battle: Confederate =

The following Confederate Army units and commanders fought in the Second Battle of Corinth of the American Civil War on October 3 and 4, 1862, in Corinth, Mississippi. Order of battle compiled from the army organization during the battle and reports. The Union order of battle is listed separately.

== Abbreviations used ==
=== Military rank ===
- MG = Major General
- BG = Brigadier General
- Col = Colonel
- Ltc = Lieutenant Colonel
- Maj = Major
- Cpt = Captain
- Lt = Lieutenant

=== Other ===
- w = wounded
- mw = mortally wounded
- k = killed
- c = captured

== Army of West Tennessee ==
MG Earl Van Dorn

=== Price's Corps (Army of the West) ===
MG Sterling Price

Division	Brigade	Regiments and Others
First Division; BG Louis Hébert (reported himself as sick morning of October 4); BG Martin E. Green	First Brigade Col Elijah Gates	16th Arkansas; 2nd Missouri - Col Francis Cockrell; 3rd Missouri - Col James A. Pritchard (w); 5th Missouri - Col James McCown; 1st Missouri Cavalry (dismounted) - Ltc William D. Maupin (k); Wade's (Missouri) Battery - Cpt William Wade
First Division; BG Louis Hébert (reported himself as sick morning of October 4); BG Martin E. Green	Second Brigade Col W. Bruce Colbert	14th Arkansas; 17th Arkansas - Ltc John Griffith; 3rd Louisiana; 40th Mississippi - Ltc Josiah A.P. Campbell (w), Maj Enoch McDonald (k); 27th Texas Cavalry (1st Legion) (dismounted) - Ltc E.R. Hawkins; 3rd Texas Cavalry (dismounted) - Ltc Giles S. Boggess; Dawson's St. Louis Battery - Cpt William E. Dawson; Clark's (Missouri) Battery - Lt James L. Faris
First Division; BG Louis Hébert (reported himself as sick morning of October 4); BG Martin E. Green	Third Brigade BG Martin E. Green; Col William H. Moore (mw)	43rd Mississippi - Col William H. Moore, Ltc Richard W. Leigh (k); 7th Mississippi Battalion - Ltc James S. Terral (w); 4th Missouri - Col Archibald MacFarlane (w); 6th Missouri - Col A. Eugene Irwin (w), Ltc Isaac N. Hedgpeth (w), Maj Joseph P. Vaughn (k); 3rd Missouri Cavalry (dismounted); Guibor's (Missouri) Battery - Cpt Henry Guibor; Landis's (Missouri) Battery - Cpt John C. Landis
First Division; BG Louis Hébert (reported himself as sick morning of October 4); BG Martin E. Green	Fourth Brigade Col John D. Martin (mw); Col Robert McLain (w)	37th Alabama - Col James F. Dowdell; 36th Mississippi - Col William W. Witherspoon; 37th Mississippi - Col Robert McLain (w); 38th Mississippi - Ltc Preston Brent; Lucas's (Missouri) Battery
Maury's Division; BG Dabney H. Maury	Moore's Brigade BG John C. Moore	42nd Alabama - Col John W. Portis; 15th Arkansas - Ltc Squire Boone; 23rd Arkansas - Ltc A. A. Pennington; 35th Mississippi - Col William T.S. Barry; 2nd Texas - Col William P. Rogers (k); Bledsoe's (Missouri) Battery - Cpt Hiram M. Bledsoe
Maury's Division; BG Dabney H. Maury	Cabell's Brigade (temporarily attached to Green's division on October 5) BG William L. Cabell (w)	18th Arkansas - Col John N. Daly (mw), Cpt William N. Parish (w); 19th Arkansas - Col Thomas P. Dockery; 20th Arkansas - Col Henry P. Johnson (k); 21st Arkansas - Col Jordan E. Cravens; 8th (Jones's) Arkansas Battalion; 12th (Rapley's) Arkansas Battalion - Cpt James A. Ashford; Appeal Battery - Lt William N. Hogg
Maury's Division; BG Dabney H. Maury	Phifer's Brigade BG Charles W. Phifer	3rd Arkansas Cavalry (dismounted); 6th Texas Cavalry (dismounted) - Col Lawrence S. Ross (w); 9th Texas Cavalry (dismounted); Stirman's Arkansas Sharpshooters - Col Erasmus J. Stirman; McNally's (Arkansas) Battery - Lt Frank A. Moore
	Cavalry Brigade BG Frank C. Armstrong	2nd Arkansas (Slemons') Cavalry - Col William F. Slemons; Wirt Adams' Cavalry Regiment - Col Wirt Adams; 2nd Missouri Cavalry (dismounted and attached to Green's Brigade) - Col Robert A. McCulloch
	Reserve Artillery Cpt William E. Burnet	Hoxton's (Tennessee) Battery - Lt Thomas F. Tobin (c); Sengstak's (Alabama) Battery - Cpt Henry H. Sengstak

=== District of the Mississippi ===
Division	Brigade	Regiments and Others
First Division; MG Mansfield Lovell	First Brigade BG Albert Rust	31st Alabama - Col Daniel R. Hundley; 35th Alabama - Cpt Alva E. Ashford; 4th Alabama Battalion - Maj John H. Gibson; 9th Arkansas - Col Isaac L. Dunlop; 3rd Kentucky - Col Albert P. Thompson; 7th Kentucky - Col Edward Crossland; Hudson's (Mississippi) Battery - Lt John R. Sweaney; Co. B, Pointe Coupee Artillery - Cpt Wm. A Davidson
First Division; MG Mansfield Lovell	Second Brigade BG John Villepigue	1st Confederate Infantry Battalion; 12th Louisiana - Col Thomas M. Scott; (2nd) Louisiana Zouave Battalion - Maj St. Leon Dupiere; 33rd Mississippi - Col David W. Hurst; 39th Mississippi - Col William B. Shelby; Co. A, Pointe Coupee Artillery - Maj George O. Watts; McClung's (Tennessee) Battery
First Division; MG Mansfield Lovell	Third Brigade BG John S. Bowen	6th Mississippi - Col Robert Lowry; 15th Mississippi - Col Michael Farrell; 22nd Mississippi - Cpt James D. Lester; Caruthers' Mississippi Sharpshooters - Cpt Copeland K. Caruthers; 1st Missouri - Ltc Amos C. Riley; Watson's (Louisiana) Battery - Cpt Allen A. Bursley
	Cavalry Brigade Col William H. Jackson	1st Mississippi Cavalry - Col Richard A. Pinson; 7th Tennessee Cavalry - Ltc John G. Stocks
