= Battle of Champion Hill order of battle: Confederate =

The following Confederate Army units and commanders fought in the Battle of Champion Hill of the American Civil War. The Union order of battle is listed separately. Order of battle compiled from the army organization, returns of casualties and reports.

== Abbreviations used ==
=== Military rank ===
- LTG = Lieutenant General
- MG = Major General
- BG = Brigadier General
- Col = Colonel
- Ltc = Lieutenant Colonel
- Maj = Major
- Cpt = Captain
- Lt = 1st Lieutenant

=== Other ===
- w = wounded
- k = killed
- c = captured

== Department of Mississippi and East Louisiana ==
LTG John C. Pemberton

- Chief of Engineers: Maj Samuel H. Lockett

Division	Brigade	Regiments and Others
Loring's Division; MG William W. Loring	1st Brigade BG Lloyd Tilghman (k); Col A. E. Reynolds	1st Confederate Infantry Battalion: Ltc G. H. Forney; 6th Mississippi: Col Robert Lowry; 23rd Mississippi: Col J. M. Wells; 26th Mississippi: Col A. E. Reynolds, Maj T. F. Parker; Company C, 14th Mississippi Artillery Battalion (4 guns): Lt J. Culbertson; Company D, 1st Mississippi Light Artillery (4 guns): Cpt J. L. Wofford; Company G, 1st Mississippi Light Artillery (6 guns): Cpt J. J. Cowan
Loring's Division; MG William W. Loring	2nd Brigade BG Abraham Buford	27th Alabama: Col J. Jackson; 35th Alabama: Col Edward Goodwin; 54th Alabama: Col Alpheus Baker (w); 55th Alabama: Col J. Snodgrass; 9th Arkansas: Col Isaac L. Dunlop; 3rd Kentucky (4 companies): Maj J. H. Bowman; 7th Kentucky: Col Edward Crossland; 12th Louisiana: Col Thomas M. Scott; Companies A & C, Pointe Coupee Artillery (8 guns): Cpt Alcide Bouanchaud and Cpt Alexander Chust
Loring's Division; MG William W. Loring	3rd Brigade BG Winfield S. Featherston	3rd Mississippi: Col T. A. Mellon; 22nd Mississippi: Col F. Schaller; 31st Mississippi: Col Jehu Amaziah Orr; 33rd Mississippi: Col David W. Hurst; 1st Mississippi Sharpshooter Battalion: Maj W. A. Rayburn

Division	Brigade	Regiments and Others
Stevenson's Division; MG Carter L. Stevenson	1st Brigade BG Seth M. Barton	40th Georgia: Ltc Robert M. Young; 41st Georgia: Col William E. Curtiss; 42nd Georgia: Col Robert J. Henderson; 43rd Georgia: Col Skidmore Harris (k), Cpt Mathadeas M. Grantham; 52nd Georgia: Col C. D. Phillips (c), Maj John J. Moore; Cherokee Georgia Artillery (4 guns): Cpt Max van den Corput
Stevenson's Division; MG Carter L. Stevenson	2nd Brigade BG Stephen D. Lee	20th Alabama: Col Isham W. Garrott; 23rd Alabama: Col Franklin K. Beck; 30th Alabama: Col C. M. Shelley; 31st Alabama: Ltc Thomas M. Arrington; 46th Alabama: Col M. L. Woods (c), Cpt George E. Brewer; Waddell's Alabama Battery (6 guns): Cpt James F. Waddell
Stevenson's Division; MG Carter L. Stevenson	3rd Brigade BG Alfred Cumming	34th Georgia: Col J. A. W. Johnson; 36th Georgia: Col J. A. Glenn; 39th Georgia: Col J. T. McConnell (w), Ltc Joseph F. B. Jackson; 56th Georgia: Col E. P. Watkins (w), Ltc John T. Slaughter; 57th Georgia: Col William Barkuloo
Stevenson's Division; MG Carter L. Stevenson	4th Brigade Col Alexander W. Reynolds	3rd Tennessee (Provisional Army): Col Newton J. Lillard; 31st Tennessee: Col William M. Bradford; 43rd Tennessee: Col James W. Gillespie; 59th Tennessee: Col William L. Eakin; 3rd Maryland Artillery (6 guns): Cpt F. O. Claiborne
Stevenson's Division; MG Carter L. Stevenson	Artillery Maj Joseph W. Anderson (k)	Botetourt (Virginia) Artillery (2 guns): Cpt J. W. Johnston; Company A, 1st Mississippi Light Artillery (4 guns): Cpt S. J. Ridley (k), Cpt W. T. Ratliff
Bowen's Division; BG John S. Bowen	1st Brigade BG Francis M. Cockrell	1st Missouri: Col Amos C. Riley; 2nd Missouri: Ltc P. S. Senteny; 3rd Missouri: Col W. R. Gause; 5th Missouri: Col James McCown; 6th Missouri: Maj Stephen Cooper; Guibor's (Missouri) Battery (4 guns): Lt W. Corkery; Landis's Missouri Battery (4 guns): Lt John M. Langan; Wade's Missouri Battery (6 guns): Lt Richard C. Walsh
Bowen's Division; BG John S. Bowen	2nd Brigade BG Martin E. Green	15th Arkansas: Ltc W. W. Reynolds; 19th Arkansas: Col Thomas P. Dockery; 20th Arkansas: Col Daniel W. Jones; 21st Arkansas: Col Jordan E. Cravens; 12th Arkansas Sharpshooter Battalion: Lt John S. Bell; 1st Arkansas Cavalry Battalion (dismounted): Cpt William S. Catterson; 1st Missouri Cavalry (dismounted): Col Elijah Gates; 3rd Missouri Cavalry (dismounted): Ltc D. T. Samuels; 3rd Missouri Light Battery (4 guns): Cpt William E. Dawson; Lowe's (Missouri) Battery (4 guns): Cpt S. Lowe
Bowen's Division; BG John S. Bowen	Cavalry	Adams' Mississippi Cavalry: Col Wirt Adams; 20th Mississippi Mounted Infantry: Ltc William N. Brown

== See also ==
- Mississippi in the American Civil War
