= Wade's Missouri Battery =

Artillery battery in the Confederate States Army

Wade's Battery 1st Light Battery Walsh's Battery
- Active: December 28, 1861–October 3, 1863
- Country: Confederate States of America
- Branch: Confederate States Army
- Type: Artillery
- Equipment: 2x 6-pounder guns 4x 12-pounder howitzers
- Engagements: American Civil War: Battle of Pea Ridge; Second Battle of Corinth; Battle of Grand Gulf; Battle of Champion Hill; Battle of Big Black River Bridge; Siege of Vicksburg

Wade's Battery (later Walsh's Battery, also known as the 1st Light Battery) was an artillery battery in the Confederate States Army during the American Civil War. The battery was mustered into Confederate service on December 28, 1861; many of the members of the battery had previously served in the Missouri State Guard. Assigned to the First Missouri Brigade, the battery saw action at the Battle of Pea Ridge and the Second Battle of Corinth in 1862. In 1863, the battery fought at the Battle of Grand Gulf, where Captain William Wade, first commander of the battery, was killed. The battery later saw action at the Battle of Champion Hill, Battle of Big Black River Bridge, and the Siege of Vicksburg. When the Confederates surrendered at the end of the Siege of Vicksburg, the men of the battery became prisoners of war. After a prisoner exchange, the men of the battery were combined with Landis's Battery and Guibor's Battery on October 3, 1863, and Wade's Battery ceased to exist as a separate unit.

== Service history ==
=== Organization ===
Captain William Wade organized the battery in December 1861. Many of the batterymen had served in the Missouri State Guard before joining the battle; recruiting activities occurred at Osceola, Missouri and Springfield, Missouri. On December 28, the battery officially joined the Confederate States Army while at Springfield. After joining the army, the battery was assigned to the First Missouri Brigade and equipped with two 6-pounder guns and four 12-pounder howitzers.

=== 1862 ===
==== Pea Ridge ====
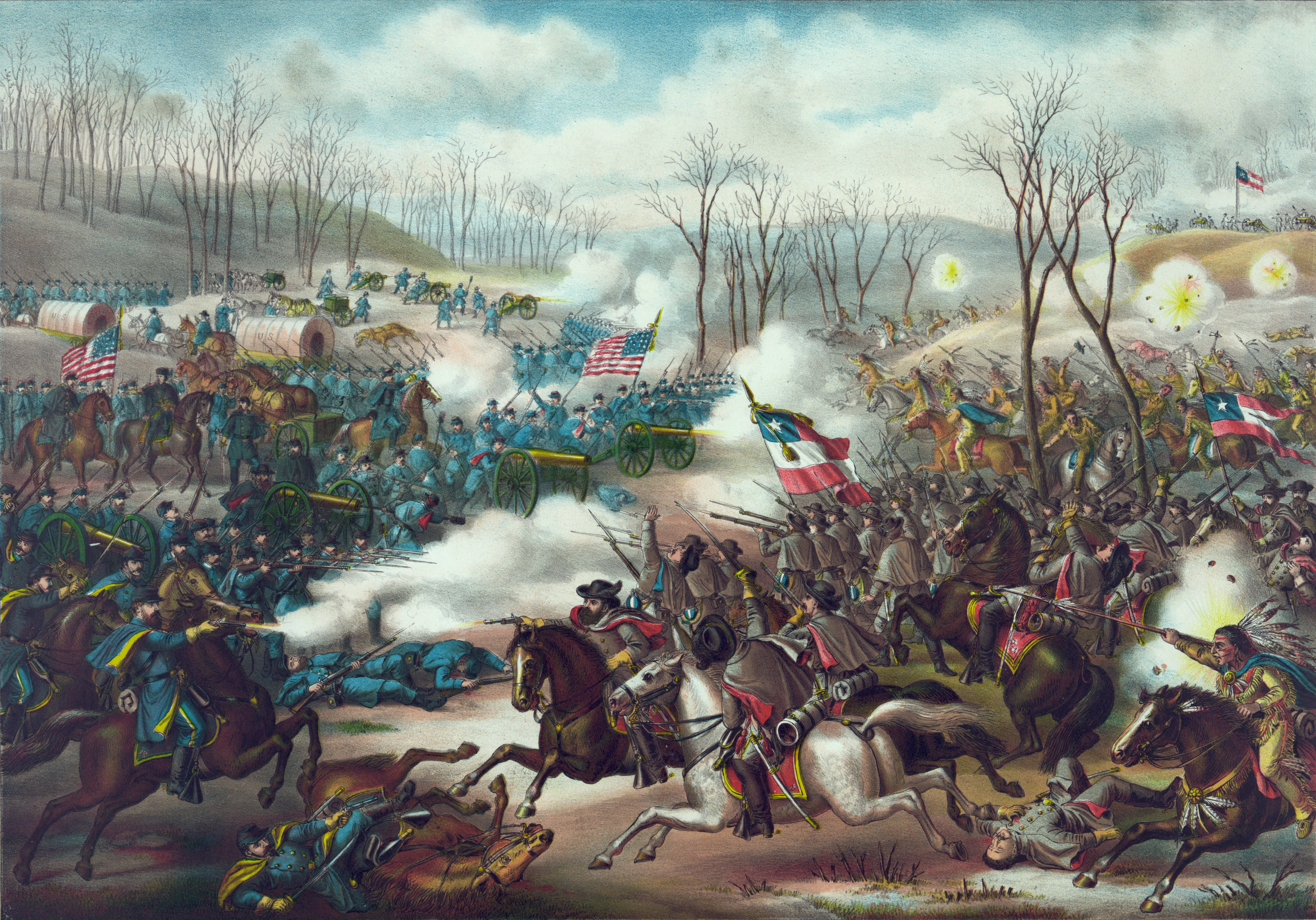
Battle of Pea Ridge

In early 1862, the battery was assigned to the forces of Major General Sterling Price; while under Price, the battery took part in a skirmish near Flat Creek, Missouri on February 15. On March 7 and 8, the battery was engaged at the Battle of Pea Ridge. At Pea Ridge, the battery was in Colonel Lewis Henry Little's brigade (the First Missouri Brigade) of Price's division of Major General Earl Van Dorn's Army of the West; also in Little's brigade were the 2nd Missouri Infantry, 3rd Missouri Infantry, 1st Missouri Cavalry, and Clark's Battery. Early on March 7, Wade's Battery, along with Clark's Battery and Guibor's Battery, engaged in an artillery duel with the 1st Iowa Battery. The Confederate cannons were able to silence the 1st Iowa Battery, which had several of its ammunition chests exploded. Early on March 8, Wade's Battery and Good's Texas Battery began firing at ranks of Union infantry which were preparing for a counterattack; however, this fire was not effective. In contrast, Union artillery began firing at the two Confederate batteries, inflicting casualties. Wade's Battery retreated in what historians William Shea and Earl J. Hess described as a "wild disorder." When the Confederate position on the end of the battlefield where Wade's Battery was engaged collapsed, Wade's Battery was one of the last units to leave the field. Wade's Battery suffered nine casualties at Pea Ridge.

==== Corinth ====
In April, Wade's Battery was ordered across the Mississippi River. The battery was then moved to Corinth, Mississippi; a May 5 muster of the battery counted 107 men. Wade's Battery did not see action at either the May 9 Battle of Farmington or the Battle of Iuka on September 19. At the Second Battle of Corinth on October 3 and 4, Wade's Battery was assigned to Colonel Elijah Gates' brigade of Brigadier General Louis Hébert's division of Price's corps of Van Dorn's Army of West Tennessee; Gates' brigade also included the 16th Arkansas Infantry, 2nd Missouri Infantry, 3rd Missouri Infantry, 5th Missouri Infantry, and the 1st Missouri Cavalry. On the first day at Corinth (October 3), Wade's Battery was positioned in front of the Confederate main line to shell Union infantry defending the outer defenses around Corinth. Heavy counterbattery fire from Battery H, 1st Missouri Light Artillery Regiment killed First Lieutenant Samuel Farrington and many horses, forcing the battery to withdraw. The battery also participated in an artillery duel that also included Landis's Battery, Guibor's Battery, and Hiram Bledsoe's Missouri Battery. The combined Confederate cannons drove off Union artillery, allowing a Confederate infantry charge to occur. Later that day, a Union infantry force threatened Landis's Battery and Guibor's Battery; Wade's Battery helped repulse the threat. At Corinth, Wade's Battery suffered 20 casualties. In December, Captain Wade was promoted to the command of the artillery in Major General John S. Bowen's division; First Lieutenant Richard Walsh replaced Wade as commander of the battery.

=== 1863 ===
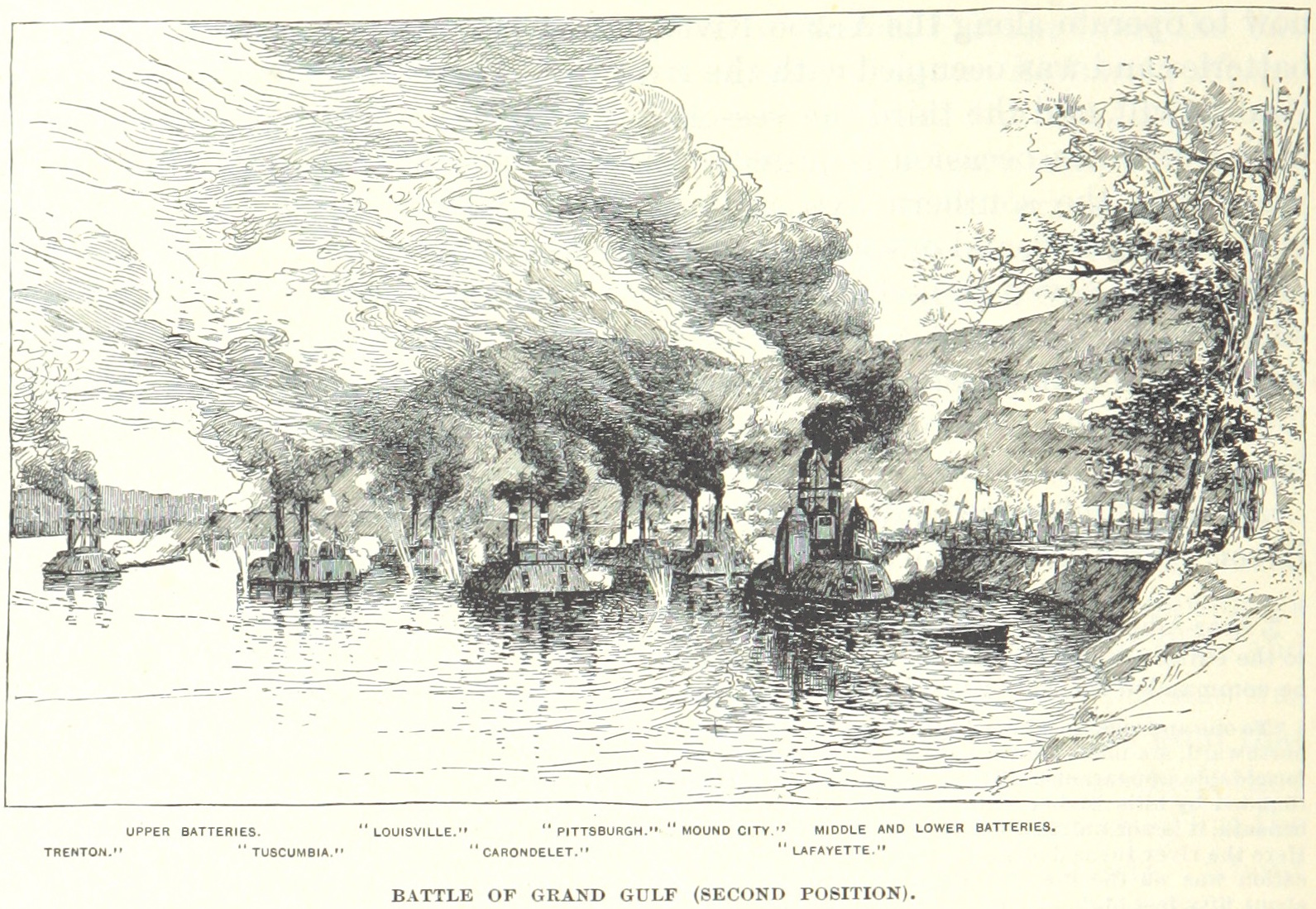
Battle of Grand Gulf

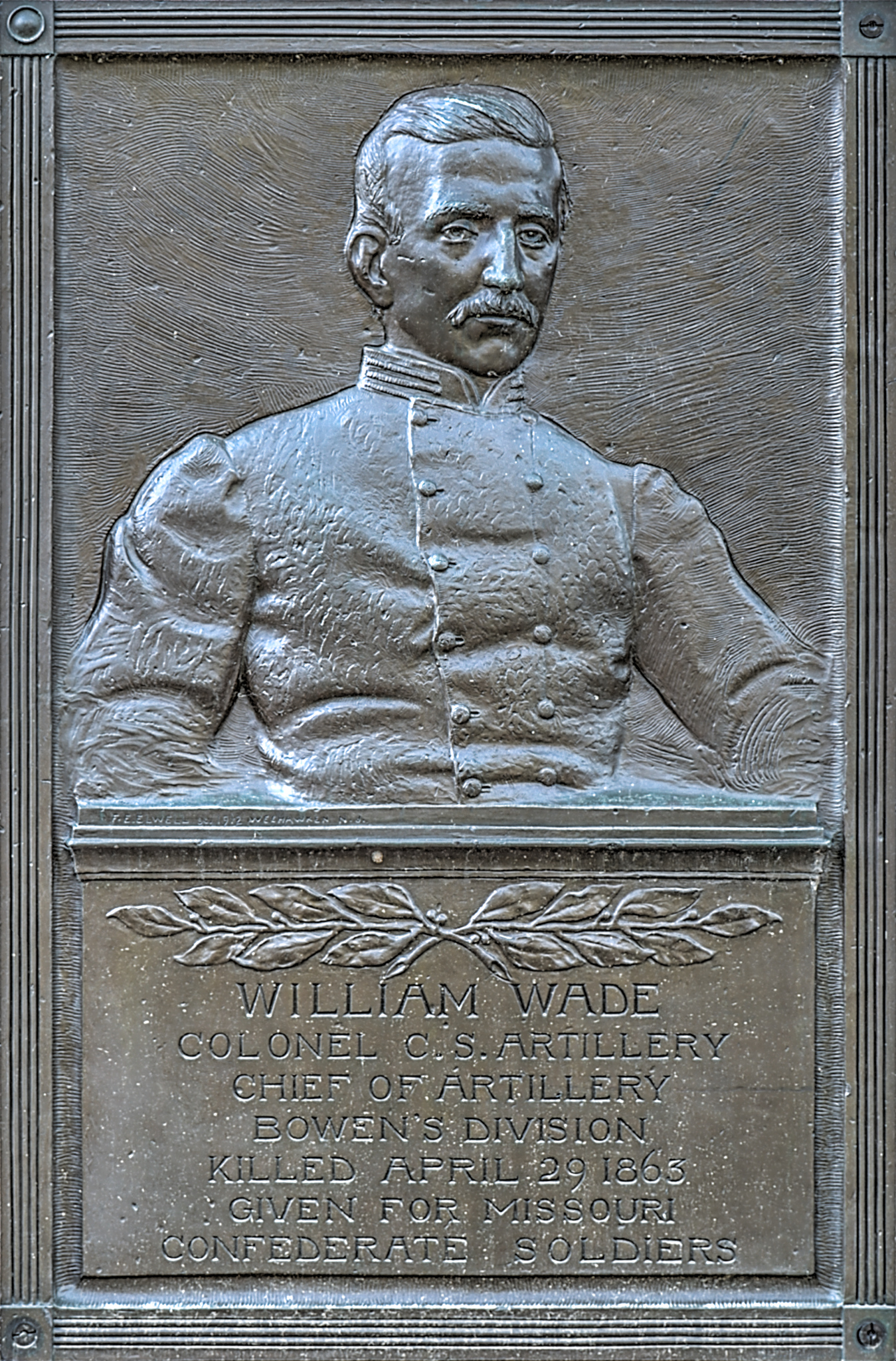
Relief portrait by Francis Edwin Elwell at Vicksburg National Military Park

In early 1863, the battery was transferred to the Vicksburg, Mississippi area, where it occupied a fortification known as Fort Wade. While at Fort Wade, the battery shelled passing ships of the Union Navy. The earlier guns of the battery had been replaced by 10-pounder Parrott rifles; one of these weapons burst on March 31, inflicting 10 casualties in the battery. Guibor's Battery was also stationed in Fort Wade. At the Battle of Grand Gulf on April 29, seven ironclad warships of the Union Navy bombarded Fort Wade and the nearby Fort Coburn. The guns of Fort Wade were silenced, but Fort Coburn continued firing. Towards the end of the fighting, Wade was killed. The battery suffered seven casualties in the battle. After Grand Gulf, the battery was temporarily placed on detached service, and missed the Battle of Port Gibson on May 1. Wade's Battery was attached to Francis Cockrell's brigade in John S. Bowen's division.

On the morning of May 16, as part of the Battle of Champion Hill, the battery fought an artillery duel, destroying a Union artillery caisson. Later that day, Wade's Battery provided supporting fire for an attack by the First Missouri Brigade; when the attackers were forced to retreat, the battery helped provide covering fire. Wade's Battery lost five men at Champion Hill. On May 17, Wade's Battery formed part of a Confederate line guarding the crossing of the Big Black River. The horses assigned to the battery had been positioned on the other side of the river; when the Confederate line broke, the men of Wade's Battery were unable to withdraw their guns. They were forced to spike their cannons before joining the retreat. After reaching the defenses of Vicksburg, the men of the battery were assigned a new weapon–a 32-pounder rifled cannon.

During the Siege of Vicksburg, many of the men of Wade's Battery engaged in sharpshooting. Beginning in late June, they began digging a tunnel for the purpose of detonating a charge of gunpowder under the Union line, but the Confederate garrison surrendered before this could be completed. The battery lost seven men during the siege; by the time of the surrender on July 4, only 52 men were left. They were paroled and reported to Demopolis, Alabama. After being exchanged, the battery was combined with Landis's Battery and Guibor's Battery on October 3; Wade's Battery ceased to exist as a separate unit.

== See also ==
- List of Missouri Confederate Civil War units

== Sources ==
- Battles and Leaders of the Civil War. Vol. 3. Secaucus, N.J.: Castle. 1987 [1883]. ISBN 0-89009-571-X.
- Cozzens, Peter (1997). The Darkest Days of the War: The Battles of Iuka and Corinth. Chapel Hill, North Carolina: University of North Carolina Press. ISBN 0-8078-2320-1.
- McGhee, James E. (2008). Guide to Missouri Confederate Regiments, 1861–1865. Fayetteville, Arkansas: University of Arkansas Press. ISBN 978-1-55728-870-7.
- Shea, William L.; Hess, Earl J. (1992). Pea Ridge: Civil War Campaign in the West. Chapel Hill, North Carolina: University of North Carolina Press. ISBN 0-8078-4669-4.
- Tucker, Philip Thomas (1993). The South's Finest: The First Missouri Brigade from Pea Ridge to Vicksburg. Shippensburg, Pennsylvania: White Mane Publishing Company. ISBN 0-942597-31-1.
