= Battle of Champion Hill order of battle =

The order of battle for the Battle of Champion Hill includes:

- Battle of Champion Hill order of battle: Confederate
- Battle of Champion Hill order of battle: Union
