= Bevier, Missouri =

- City
- Location in Macon County and the state of Missouri
- Coordinates: 39°44′57″N 92°33′50″W
- Country: United States
- State: Missouri
- County: Macon

Area
  - Total: 1.04 sq mi (2.69 km^{2})
  - Land: 1.04 sq mi (2.69 km^{2})
  - Water: 0 sq mi (0.00 km^{2})
- Elevation: 843 ft (257 m)

Population (2020)
  - Total: 636
  - Density: 612.7/sq mi (236.56/km^{2})
- Time zone: UTC-6 (Central (CST))
  - Summer (DST): UTC-5 (CDT)
- ZIP code: 63532
- Area code: 660
- FIPS code: 29-05266
- GNIS feature ID: 2394160

Bevier (/bəˈvɪər/ bə-VEER) is a city in Macon County, Missouri, United States. The population was 636 at the 2020 census, down from 718 recorded in 2010.

== History ==
Bevier was laid out and platted in 1858 along a new railroad line. The community was named for Kentucky native Robert Bevier, who afterward became a colonel in the Confederate army. A post office called Bevier has been in operation since 1858.

Coal was discovered in Bevier in 1860, and coal mining was an important part of the town economy well into the 20th century. Bevier was incorporated as a village on September 5, 1881, and reorganized as a city on March 16, 1889.

The First Congregational Church of Bevier, established in the community in 1865, was later renamed to the United Church of Bevier. The church was formally dissolved in 2012 following a sharp decline in regular membership, merging into the United Church of New Cambria in neighboring New Cambria, Missouri.

A fire destroyed The Pear Tree Restaurant in November 2012, spreading to the adjacent Black Diamond Museum and rendering both buildings total losses. Residents of Bevier, in a race against time, banded together to save various items from the blaze. The Black Diamond Museum later reopened within the then-disused United Church of Bevier in 2018, operated by the Bevier Black Diamond Historical Preservation Organization.

== Geography ==
Bevier is located in south-central Macon County at 39°44′57″N 92°33′50″W (39.749126, -92.563902). U.S. Route 36 passes through the northern extent of the city, with access from Highways C and O. US 36 leads east 5 miles (8 km) to Macon, the county seat, and west 28 miles (45 km) to Brookfield. State Highway C runs just over 25 miles (40 km) south, providing travelers from Bevier access to the reservoir and campgrounds at Thomas Hill, and to Huntsville further south, providing westerly access to the city of Moberly. State Highway O runs just over 20 miles (32 km) north of Bevier, providing access to Long Branch State Park via the adjoining Axtell Road, and terminating west of Atlanta.

According to the U.S. Census Bureau, Bevier has a total area of 1.04 square miles (2.69 km^{2}), all of it recorded as land. An unnamed creek passes through the center of town, flowing west toward the Middle Fork of the Little Chariton River, a south-flowing tributary of the Missouri.

== Demographics ==
Historical population
Census	Pop.	Note	%±
1870	833		—
1880	867		4.1%
1890	876		1.0%
1900	1,808		106.4%
1910	1,900		5.1%
1920	1,868		−1.7%
1930	1,229		−34.2%
1940	1,105		−10.1%
1950	838		−24.2%
1960	781		−6.8%
1970	806		3.2%
1980	733		−9.1%
1990	643		−12.3%
2000	723		12.4%
2010	718		−0.7%
2020	636		−11.4%
U.S. Decennial Census

=== 2010 census ===
As of the census of 2010, there were 718 people, 287 households, and 191 families living in the city. The population density was 697.1 inhabitants per square mile (269.2/km^{2}). There were 341 housing units at an average density of 331.1 per square mile (127.8/km^{2}). The racial makeup of the city was 97.4% White, 1.3% African American, 0.4% Asian, and 1.0% from two or more races. Hispanic or Latino of any race were 0.1% of the population.

There were 287 households, of which 35.9% had children under the age of 18 living with them, 46.0% were married couples living together, 15.3% had a female householder with no husband present, 5.2% had a male householder with no wife present, and 33.4% were non-families. 29.6% of all households were made up of individuals, and 14.6% had someone living alone who was 65 years of age or older. The average household size was 2.50 and the average family size was 3.07.

The median age in the city was 40.1 years. 26.2% of residents were under the age of 18; 8.1% were between the ages of 18 and 24; 23.5% were from 25 to 44; 27% were from 45 to 64; and 15.2% were 65 years of age or older. The gender makeup of the city was 48.2% male and 51.8% female.

=== 2000 census ===
As of the census of 2000, there were 723 people, 303 households, and 195 families living in the city. The population density was 838.6 inhabitants per square mile (323.8/km^{2}). There were 342 housing units at an average density of 396.7 per square mile (153.2/km^{2}). The racial makeup of the city was 97.65% White, 0.83% Native American, 0.41% Asian, and 1.11% from two or more races. Hispanic or Latino of any race were 0.14% of the population.

There were 303 households, out of which 32.3% had children under the age of 18 living with them, 49.2% were married couples living together, 12.2% had a female householder with no husband present, and 35.6% were non-families. 32.3% of all households were made up of individuals, and 15.5% had someone living alone who was 65 years of age or older. The average household size was 2.39 and the average family size was 3.02.

In the city the population was spread out, with 26.4% under the age of 18, 8.2% from 18 to 24, 27.8% from 25 to 44, 20.2% from 45 to 64, and 17.4% who were 65 years of age or older. The median age was 37 years. For every 100 females there were 96.5 males. For every 100 females age 18 and over, there were 90.0 males.

The median income for a household in the city was $28,250, and the median income for a family was $34,479. Males had a median income of $25,078 versus $17,284 for females. The per capita income for the city was $13,099. About 1.6% of families and 7.6% of the population were below the poverty line, including 5.9% of those under age 18 and 11.0% of those age 65 or over.

== Education ==
Students in and around Bevier are within the jurisdiction of the Bevier C-4 School District, which occupies a single two-story complex in the City of Bevier. The district, a public institution, is responsible for educating students in kindergarten through the twelfth grade. The district's athletics department presents itself in competitive sports as the Bevier Wildcats. High school students enrolled in the Bevier C-4 School District are eligible to participate in various vocational programs offered by the Macon Area Career and Technical Education Center (MACTEC) in neighboring Macon, Missouri.

== Notable people ==
- Robert Bevier (1834–1889), Confederate colonel
- John V. Cox (born 1930), major general in the United States Marine Corps
