= Robert Bevier =

American military officer (1834–1889)

Robert S. Bevier (April 28, 1834, Painted Post, New York – February 24, 1889, Owensboro, Kentucky) was an American and a military officer. He was a Missouri colonel in the American Civil War and fought with the Confederate Army.

Bevier fought in the Wakarusa War against the anti-slavery Kansas Jayhawkers in 1855. He opened a law practice in Macon, Missouri in 1858, and was a founder of Bevier, Missouri, which was laid out in 1858 and named for him.

With the coming of the Civil War, Bevier enlisted in the Confederate Missouri State Guard in 1861. He was elected Colonel of the 4th Regiment of the 3rd Division. At the Battle of Pea Ridge on March 6–8, 1862, Bevier was in command of Bevier's Missouri Infantry Battalion which fought with the Missouri State Guard on the left wing of the Confederate forces. By September 1, 1862, Bevier was Colonel of a four-company battalion which, with another battalion led by James McCown, formed the understrength 5th Regiment of Missouri Infantry. At the encampment of the Confederate Army of the West (1862) at Saltillo, Mississippi on that date, the 5th Regiment was brought up to full strength with the addition of another company and achieved regimental status. McCown was elected Colonel of the regiment with Bevier as his lieutenant.

The regiment was involved in nearly continuous combat during the war. The regiment went on to fight in the Iuka-Corinth Campaign at Iuka (September 19, 1862) and in the Second Battle of Corinth (October 3–4, 1862) and in the Vicksburg Campaign. It was captured en masse at the fall of Vicksburg although paroled soldiers were formed into a consolidated 3rd and 5th Regiment which fought until the end of the war. Robert Bevier was one of two Lieutenant Colonels in this consolidated regiment.

Bevier later wrote a war history, A History of the First and Second Missouri Confederate Brigades, published in 1879.

== Works ==
- Bevier, R. S. (1879). History Of The First And Second Missouri Confederate Brigades: 1861 - 1865 And From Wakarusa To Appomattox, A Military Anagraph. St. Louis: Bryan, Brand and Company. ISBN 978-1492310273.
