= John V. Cox =

United States Marine Corps general (1930–2026)

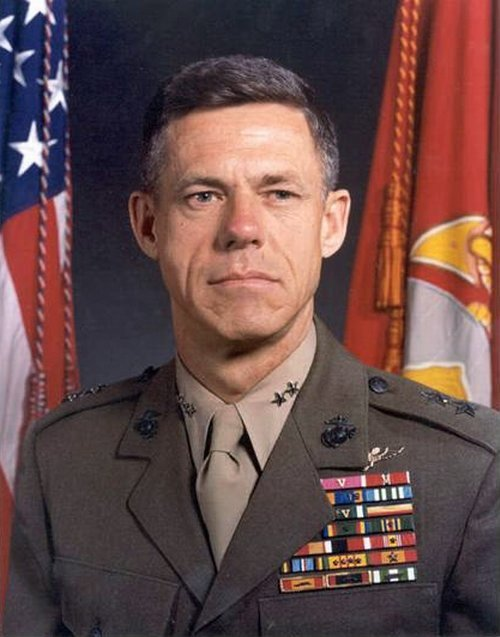
- Major General John V. Cox
- Born: March 26, 1930; Bevier, Missouri, U.S.
- Died: March 1, 2026 (aged 95)
- Military career
- Allegiance: United States of America
- Branch: United States Marine Corps
- Service years: 1952–1985
- Rank: Major General
- Commands: VMF-115; 3rd Marine Aircraft Wing; 9th MAB; Marine Corps Air Station El Toro
- Conflicts: Vietnam War
- Awards: Defense Distinguished Service Medal; Legion of Merit; Air Medal; Bronze Star

John Vincent Cox (March 26, 1930 – March 1, 2026) was an American military officer. A native of Missouri, he served nearly 33 years as a United States Marine Corps naval aviator before retiring with the rank of Major General. Cox served two tours of duty during the Vietnam War, flying 292 combat missions, and earned several important medals and awards during his career.

== Early life ==
John Cox, son of coal miner Norris Cox and wife Ruth, was born and raised in Bevier, Macon County, Missouri, along with older brother Lynn and sisters Josephine and Nancy. Despite the death of his father when he was just nineteen years old, Cox was able to attend Northeast Missouri State Teachers College in Kirksville, earning a Bachelor of Science degree in Business Administration in May 1952. After graduation from Northeast Missouri State he joined the Marine Corps through their officer candidate program and reported to Marine Officers Basic School at Quantico, Virginia, on July 10, 1952.

== Military career ==
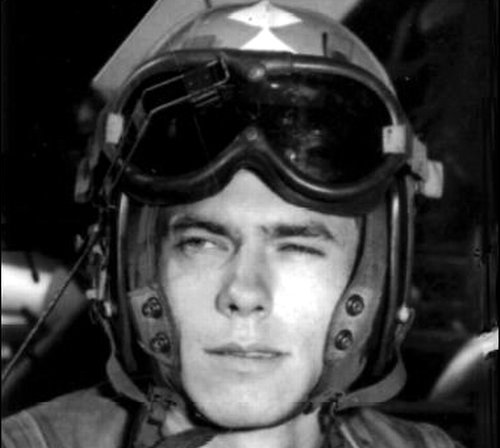
General Cox as a young Marine aviator in the 1950s.

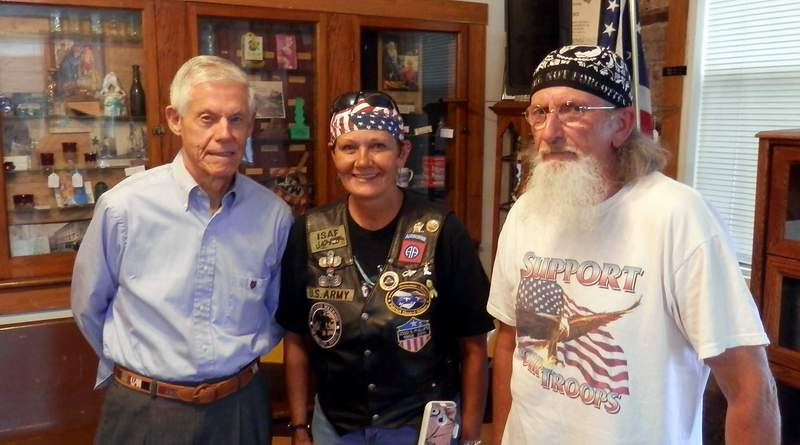
Retired General Cox with members of the Missouri Patriot Guard Riders following a speaking engagement in Macon, Missouri, in August, 2013.

Cox was commissioned a Marine Corps second lieutenant upon his graduation from Officers Basic School in September, 1952 and was assigned to naval aviator training shortly afterward. He completed flight training and was designated a Naval Aviator in July, 1954. Lieutenant Cox first assignment was to Marine Corps Air Station Miami and the aircraft carrier USS Lake Champlain, the first of a dozen carriers he would serve on in his career. In 1957, after completing a one-year tour as an air and naval gunfire platoon leader, Cox was assigned to VMF-451 flying the FJ-4 Fury from duty stations at MCAS El Toro, NAF Atsugi, and PingTung, Taiwan during the Second Taiwan Strait Crisis.

After transitioning to the Vought F-8 Crusader, Cox joined VMFA-333 in 1959 and later returned to Quantico to attend Communications Officers School in 1962. Following the latest schooling he returned to MCAS El Toro as Communications Officer of MAG-15 and then Operations officer for VMA-513. During the latter assignment Cox did his first of two tours in Vietnam, flying 95 combat missions in the F-4 Phantom. In 1965 Cox returned to the Midwestern U.S. for duty at NAS Olathe (Kansas), and then Armed Forces Staff College in 1967. He served two years as an instructor at the Naval War College from 1967 to 1969 then was named commanding officer of VMFA-115.

Now a lieutenant colonel, Cox returned to Vietnam from 1969 to 1970 for a second tour of duty as both commander of VMFA-115 and executive officer of Marine Aircraft Group 13, stationed at Chu Lai Air Base. Colonel Cox achieved a career milestone during the tour and was featured in the May 24, 1970 Pacific edition of Stars and Stripes as he flew his 200th combat mission and achieved 4,000 accident-free flying hours on the same mission. Following his second Vietnam tour, Colonel Cox served in varied positions throughout the early and mid-1970s, including serving on the staff of Commander in Chief, Pacific Command (CINCPAC) under Admiral John S. McCain, Jr. and executive officer of MCAS Kaneohe Bay. Cox was selected to attend the National War College, which he graduated from in 1974, and then served at Headquarters Marine Corps. While in the Washington, D.C., area he also earned a Master's degree in international affairs from George Washington University.

He was promoted to brigadier general on November 4, 1977. With his new rank he served in assignments as assistant commander of the 1st Marine Air Wing, commanding general of the 9th Marine Amphibious Brigade, and duty as assistant chief of staff then deputy chief of staff for research, development and studies at Headquarters Marine Corps. He began the 1980s as commanding general of MCAS El Toro, and was promoted to major general on April 9, 1981. Cox served as commanding general of the 3rd Marine Aircraft Wing until May, 1982. In June of that year General Cox began his final assignment in the Marine Corps as director of operations (J-3) for the commander in chief at Camp H. M. Smith, Hawaii. He retired from the Marine Corps on July 1, 1985. During his career he amassed 5,043 hours total flight time and was a rated pilot in nearly every Marine Corps fixed-wing aircraft of the Cold War era, including the F6F Hellcat, AD-4 Skyraider, FJ-4 Fury, F8U Crusader, and F-4 Phantom II.

== Retirement and death ==
After retirement Cox remained active with the Navy League of the United States, the Marine Corps Aviation Association, Navy Relief, and occasional speaking engagements. Cox and wife Pat resided in McLean, Virginia. He died on March 1, 2026, at the age of 95.

== Awards and honors ==
=== Military ===
| Defense Distinguished Service Medal |
| Legion of Merit with Combat "V" |
| Bronze Star Medal with Combat "V" |
| Air Medal with Numeral 19 |
| Joint Service Commendation Medal |
| Navy Commendation Medal with Combat V and Gold Star |

=== Civilian ===
- Honored in 2007 with Distinguished Service Award by Truman State University.
