= 3rd Missouri Infantry Regiment (Confederate) =

Infantry regiment of the Confederate States Army

- Active: January 17, 1862 to October 6, 1863
- Allegiance: Confederate States of America
- Branch: Confederate States Army
- Type: Infantry
- Size: 450 (May 5, 1862)
- Engagements: American Civil War: Battle of Pea Ridge; Battle of Farmington, Mississippi; Battle of Iuka; Second Battle of Corinth; Battle of Grand Gulf; Battle of Port Gibson; Battle of Champion Hill; Battle of Big Black River Bridge; Siege of Vicksburg

The 3rd Missouri Infantry Regiment served in the Confederate States Army during the American Civil War. The infantry regiment was officially mustered into service on January 17, 1862. It fought at the Battle of Pea Ridge in Arkansas in March before being transferred across the Mississippi River. While stationed at Corinth, Mississippi, the regiment played a minor role in the Battle of Farmington before the evacuation of the town. In September, the unit saw light action at the Battle of Iuka before being heavily engaged during the Second Battle of Corinth as the Confederates attempted to retake the town in October. In early 1863, the regiment was transferred to Grand Gulf, Mississippi, in order to strengthen the defenses of the Mississippi River at that point. At the Battle of Grand Gulf on April 29, the unit helped repulse a Union Navy attack against the Confederate defensive works. After elements of the Union Army of the Tennessee landed below Grand Gulf, the regiment fought in a delaying action at the Battle of Port Gibson on May 1.

After the Confederate defeat at Port Gibson, the 3rd Missouri Infantry Regiment was engaged at the Battle of Champion Hill, another unsuccessful attempt to stop Major General Ulysses S. Grant's advance against Vicksburg, on May 16. The regiment was routed the next day at the Battle of Big Black River Bridge while serving as part of the rear guard. After Big Black River Bridge, the unit entered the fortifications of Vicksburg, which were soon besieged. During the Siege of Vicksburg, the regiment was often used as a reserve unit, although it saw heavy fighting during a Union assault against the Stockade Redan on May 22. On July 4, the Confederate garrison of Vicksburg surrendered, and the survivors of the regiment were eventually paroled and exchanged. On October 6, the regiment was combined with the 5th Missouri Infantry Regiment to form the 3rd and 5th Missouri Infantry Regiment (Consolidated). The new regiment then fought in the Atlanta campaign in 1864 before being almost annihilated at the Battle of Franklin on November 30, 1864. In early 1865, the consolidated regiment was transferred to Mobile, Alabama, where it surrendered on April 9.

== Background and formation ==
When the American Civil War began in 1861, Missouri voted against secession, despite being a slave state. Claiborne Fox Jackson, the Governor of Missouri, supported secession. After pro-secession state militia were dispersed in the Camp Jackson affair on May 10, Jackson responded by forming the Missouri State Guard on May 12. Major General Sterling Price was appointed to command the unit. Brigadier General Nathaniel Lyon of the Union Army drove the secessionists into the southwestern portion of the state, but was defeated and killed at the Battle of Wilson's Creek in August. The Missouri State Guard had further victories after Wilson's Creek, but were confined to southwestern Missouri by the end of the year. While at Neosho in November, Jackson and the pro-secession legislators voted to secede from the United States, joining the Confederate States of America. The anti-secession elements of the state legislature had previously reaffirmed their position in Jefferson City in July, giving the state two conflicting governments.

The 3rd Missouri Infantry Regiment was mustered into the Confederate States Army on January 17, 1862, while it was stationed at Springfield. Initially, it was planned to name it the 2nd Missouri Infantry Regiment, but it was found that two Missouri infantry regiments had already entered Confederate service, necessitating a designation as the 3rd Missouri Infantry Regiment. The regiment soon joined the First Missouri Brigade. Benjamin A. Rives was the regiment's first colonel, James A. Pritchard was appointed as the first lieutenant colonel, and Finley L. Hubbell was the first major. As of the muster date, the regiment contained ten companies, designated with the letters A–I and K; all were Missouri-raised. (Note: Company E was disbanded on August 12, 1862 and replaced by a company of Erwin's Missouri Battalion.)

== Service history ==
=== 1862 ===
==== Pea Ridge ====
On February 12, 1862, the regiment left Springfield for Cove Creek, Arkansas, as part of a Confederate withdrawal caused by Union pressure. The 3rd Missouri Infantry saw some action as a rear guard unit during the retreat. On March 3, the regiment left Cove Creek as part of a Confederate advance against a Union force that was in the Pea Ridge, Arkansas, area. Over the course of the subsequent battle, the regiment was in the First Missouri Brigade, which was commanded by Colonel Lewis Henry Little. On the morning of March 7, Price's division, which contained Little's brigade, encountered Union troops near a position known as Cross Timber Hollow. Little's brigade was deployed in line; the 3rd Missouri Infantry was assigned a line of advance along Telegraph Road, which ran through the area. In the afternoon, Little's brigade attacked a Union line arrayed around the Elkhorn Tavern. At one point the fighting, the 3rd Missouri Infantry, led from the front by Rives, initially drove the enemy back before becoming disorganized and halting. On March 8, a Union cannonade forced the 3rd Missouri Infantry back from an exposed position in an open field to a more protected one in some woods. A Union counterattack then drove in the right flank of Little's brigade, causing the Missourians to retreat. Rives had been mortally wounded on either the 7th or the 8th; Pritchard took over command of the regiment in Rives' stead. (Note: Rives died on either the 8th or the 11th.) The regiment's losses at Pea Ridge are variously reported as either 104 (26 killed, 45 wounded, and 33 missing) or 117 (39 killed, 45 wounded, and 33 missing).

==== Second Corinth ====
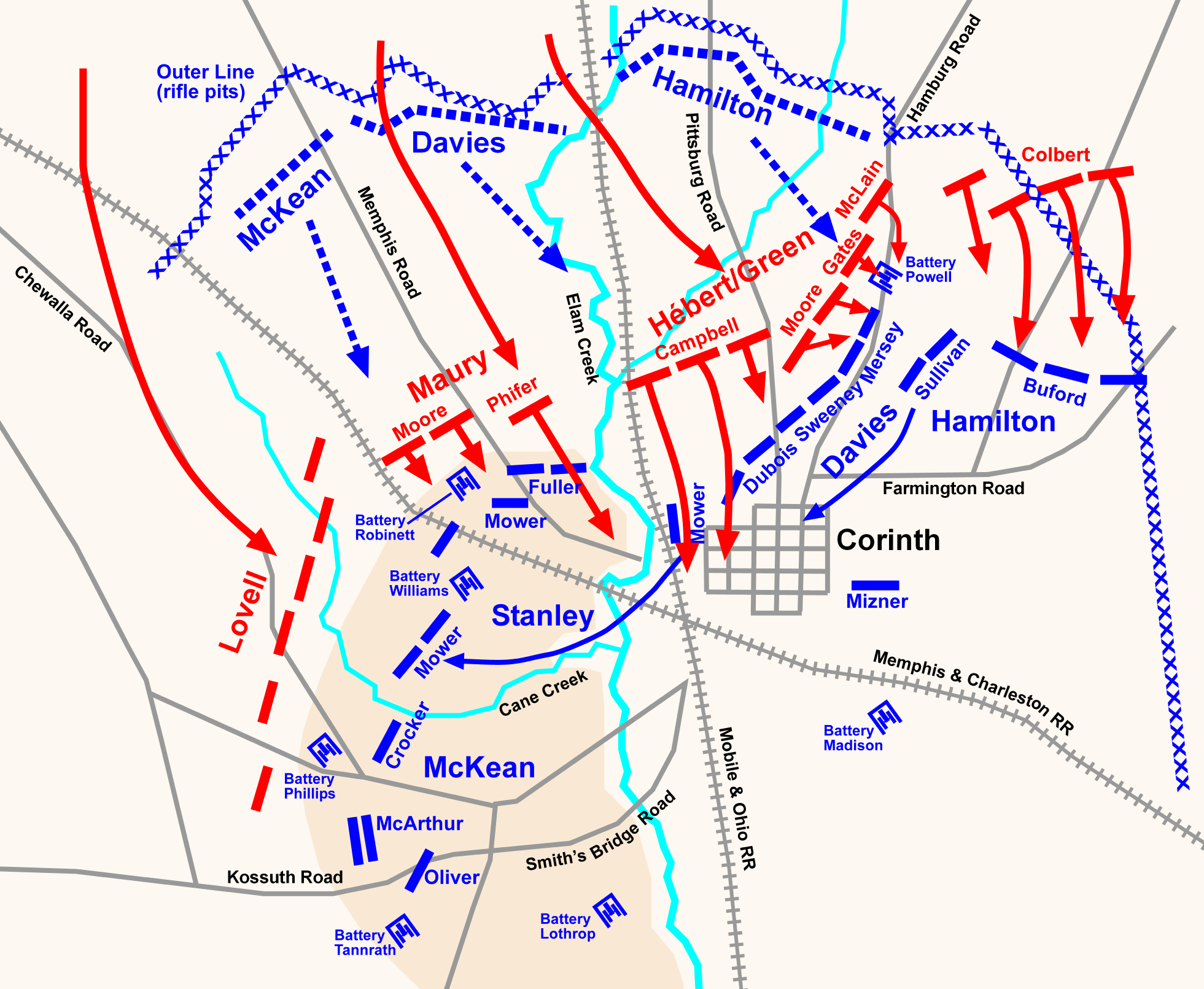
Second Battle of Corinth

After the defeat at Pea Ridge, the regiment fell back to the Van Buren, Arkansas, area. In late March, the regiment transferred to Des Arc, Arkansas. Crossing the Mississippi River, the regiment reached Memphis, Tennessee, on April 7, but was soon sent to Corinth, Mississippi, where a roll call was performed on May 5, determining that 450 men of the regiment were present for duty. On May 9, the regiment was present at the Battle of Farmington, but did not see much action. In late May, the Siege of Corinth ended when the Confederates evacuated the town, and the 3rd Missouri Infantry spent the summer stationed at various points in northern Mississippi. Price's army then moved to Iuka, Mississippi, where it was trapped by Union forces. At the Battle of Iuka on September 19, the regiment was subjected to artillery fire, but was not otherwise engaged. After the battle, the Confederates were able to escape from the Union trap. Price and Major General Earl Van Dorn then united and moved to retake Corinth.

At the Second Battle of Corinth on October 3 and 4, the 3rd Missouri Infantry was part of Colonel Elijah Gates' brigade of Brigadier General Louis Hébert's division. On October 3, Gates' brigade reinforced Brigadier General Martin E. Green's brigade in a charge against a stubborn Union line, but only the 2nd Missouri Infantry Regiment was heavily engaged. However, even with Gates' brigade in good shape, Price determined not to attempt a large-scale assault against the interior Union lines on the 3rd. On October 4, Gates' brigade and Green's brigade (now commanded by Colonel William H. Moore) began an assault against the interior Union works around 10:00 a.m. The target of Gates' brigade was a fortification known as Battery Powell. The 3rd Missouri Infantry clashed with the 52nd Illinois Infantry Regiment, defeating the Union regiment. However, Pritchard was shot in the shoulder and had to be carried off the field; Hubbell took command of the regiment. Pritchard's wound proved to be mortal. Gates' brigade was able to capture Battery Powell, but was driven off by a Union counterattack. Hubbell reported that most of the 3rd Missouri Infantry broke and was routed during the retreat. The regiment lost 92 men at Second Corinth. William R. Gause, who had been promoted from command of Company B to lieutenant colonel in May, took over the regiment permanently after the battle.

=== 1863 ===
==== Grand Gulf, Port Gibson, and Champion Hill ====
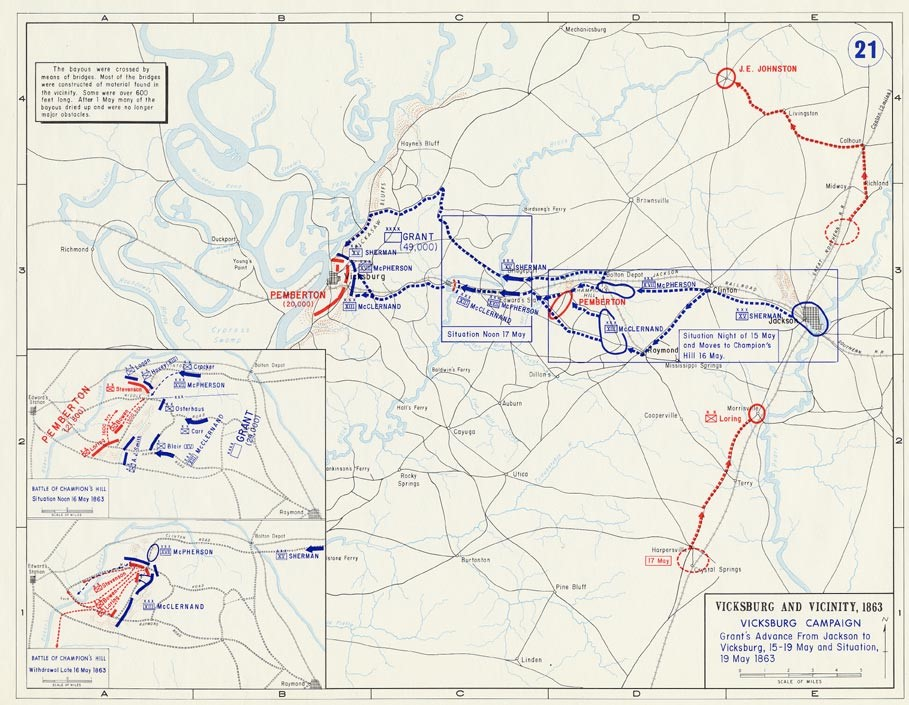
Movements towards Champion Hill

In early 1863, the regiment was transferred to the Big Black River, where it guarded a bridge. In March, the regiment moved to Grand Gulf, Mississippi, where the men built fortifications, strengthening the defenses of Vicksburg, Mississippi. On April 5, the 3rd Missouri Infantry, as part of a larger force, was moved across the Mississippi River into Louisiana, where they encamped near Bayou Vidal in Tensas Parish. On April 8, the unit fought in a small action at James' Plantation nearby. An attempt by the reconnaissance force to strike a major blow against Union forces occupying the area on April 15 failed when the element of surprise for a planned attack was lost. On April 17, the arrival of Union Navy ships forced the Confederates to return to Mississippi. The regiment then rejoined the defenses at Grand Gulf. At the Battle of Grand Gulf on April 29, the 3rd Missouri Infantry defended a line of rifle pits that extended between the two main Confederate fortifications. The unit's position allowed the men to shoot into the portholes of the Union Navy ships shelling the Confederate position. The regiment lost one man killed and three wounded in the battle. The Confederate victory prevented Union Major General Ulysses S. Grant from landing a force at that point, although Grant was able to land a strong force south of the position. Brigadier General John S. Bowen, the Confederate commander at Grand Gulf, responded to the Union landing by sending a force to Port Gibson, Mississippi to intercept Grant.

At the Battle of Port Gibson on May 1, the 3rd Missouri Infantry, along with the 5th Missouri Infantry Regiment, supported the Confederate left flank. The two regiments remained in reserve for much of the early fighting. In the early afternoon, when the Confederate left was in danger of breaking, the two regiments were sent to assault the Union right flank. However, Union leadership noticed the threat and sent troops to support the area where they expected the attack. A canebrake provided cover for the Confederate attack, which fell upon a Union line composed of the brigades of Colonel James R. Slack and Brigadier General George F. McGinnis and five artillery batteries. Despite breaking Slack's right, the weight of superior Union numbers and effective Union artillery fire drove the Confederates back to the cover of a creek bank. After two hours, the two regiments began to run low on ammunition and were ordered to withdraw. However, the attack had bought valuable time for the main Confederate line to regroup. One historian reports the 3rd Missouri Infantry's Port Gibson casualties as 24, while another has estimated that the 3rd and 5th Missouri suffered a combined total in excess of 200 casualties. The Confederates then fell back from Port Gibson, burning bridges in the process. In turn, Grant moved east in order to aim his attack at an angle that would trap the Confederates in Vicksburg. During the movement, Grant captured Jackson, Mississippi. The Confederate force at Vicksburg was commanded by Lieutenant General John C. Pemberton. Another Confederate force, commanded by General Joseph E. Johnston was positioned north of Jackson. Johnston ordered Pemberton to move east from Vicksburg so that the Confederates could join to strike Grant. While making the necessary movements, some of Pemberton's force encountered elements of Grant's army on May 16, starting the Battle of Champion Hill.

At Champion Hill, Company G of the 3rd Missouri Infantry was detached from the regiment as part of a unit of skirmishers drawn from the various regiments of the First Missouri Brigade. Hubbell, who was by then a lieutenant colonel, commanded the detachment. Later in the battle, the Confederate left was severely threatened by Union assaults, and the First Missouri Brigade was sent to shore up the failing line. The brigade's right flank was exposed, and the rightmost regiment, the 5th Missouri Infantry, was forced to fall back. That movement in turn exposed the flank of the 3rd Missouri Infantry, which also fell back. After regrouping, the two regiments counterattacked to regain the line of their former positions. The entire brigade then charged the main Union position, capturing a crossroads and Champion Hill, two key battlefield locations. Hubbell was mortally wounded by a shot through the arm during the charge. However, Union reinforcements and massed artillery fire first stopped, and then repulsed, the charge. The men of the First Missouri Brigade, including the 3rd Missouri Infantry, were forced to retreat. The regiment lost 143 men as casualties at Champion Hill, including 36 killed.

==== Big Black River Bridge and the Siege of Vicksburg ====
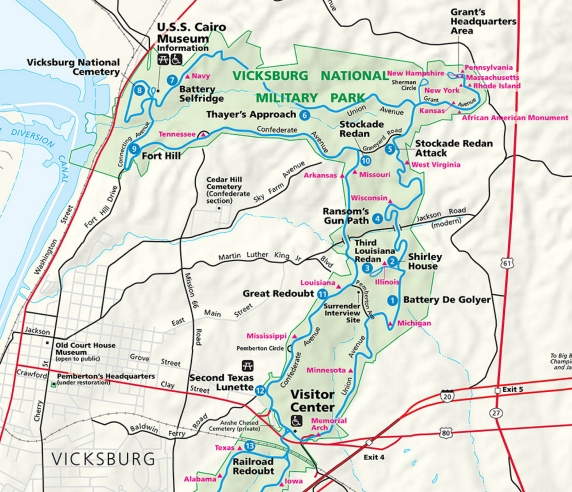
National Park Service map showing the location of the Stockade Redan

On May 17, the First Missouri Brigade was part of a rear guard holding the crossing of the Big Black River. However, a Union charge broke the Confederate line and routed the defenders in the Battle of Big Black River Bridge. The regiment then entered the defensive works at Vicksburg, which were then besieged by Union forces. On May 18, Cockrell's brigade was engaged in a small action near Mint Spring Bayou. This forward position was determined to be dangerous due to a large ravine between it and the main Confederate line, so it was abandoned on the 19th. The 3rd Missouri Infantry was used as a reserve when Union forces attacked on May 19. On May 22, the men of the regiment manned the Confederate line at a point known as the Stockade Redan, where they, as well as other elements of the First Missouri Brigade, fought off Union attacks against the position. When the attack failed, a number of Union soldiers were trapped in a ditch in front of the Confederate position. After the Union soldiers refused calls to surrender, men of the 3rd Missouri Infantry secured a number of artillery shells, lit the fuses, and then threw the explosive shells into the Union position as improvised hand grenades.

The regiment saw further action repulsing Union assaults in June and July, but it was frequently used as a reserve unit. By the time the Confederate garrison of Vicksburg surrendered on July 4, the regiment had suffered 55 casualties. After the capitulation, the survivors of the regiment were paroled, although about 100 men deserted. The men of the regiment then moved to Demopolis, Alabama, and were exchanged on September 12. On October 6, the regiment was combined with the 5th Missouri Infantry to form the 3rd and 5th Missouri Infantry Regiment (Consolidated); the 3rd Missouri Infantry ceased to exist as a separate unit.

== Legacy ==
The 3rd Missouri Infantry had been reduced to four companies during the process of consolidating with the 5th Missouri Infantry; these companies became Companies B, D, E, and H within the consolidated regiment. Colonel James McCown of the 5th Missouri Infantry commanded the new regiment, as Gause, commander of the 3rd Missouri Infantry, had been transferred to the Trans-Mississippi Department. The regiment fought in the Atlanta campaign in 1864, including at the Battle of New Hope Church on May 25 and at the Battle of Kennesaw Mountain on June 19. On October 5, the regiment fought at the Battle of Allatoona, where it suffered 76 casualties, and on November 30, at the Battle of Franklin, where it lost 113 of the approximately 150 remaining men. In February 1865, the regiment was transferred to Mobile, Alabama, adding to the city's defenses, where it surrendered on April 9 at the Battle of Fort Blakeley.

== Commanders ==
Three men served as colonel of the 3rd Missouri Infantry Regiment, none of whom were with the regiment when it was consolidated with the 5th Missouri Infantry: Rives (mortally wounded at Pea Ridge), Pritchard (mortally wounded at Second Corinth), and Gause (transferred in September 1863). Pritchard, Gause, Hubbell, and James K. McDowell were the regiment's lieutenant colonels. Hubbell, McDowell, and Robert J. Williams all held the rank of major in the regiment.

== See also ==
- List of Missouri Confederate Civil War units

== Sources ==
- Ballard, Michael B. (2004). Vicksburg: The Campaign that Opened the Mississippi. Chapel Hill, North Carolina: University of North Carolina Press. ISBN 0-8078-2893-9.
- Cozzens, Peter (1997). The Darkest Days of the War: The Battles of Iuka and Corinth. Chapel Hill, North Carolina: University of North Carolina Press. ISBN 0-8078-2320-1.
- Gottschalk, Phil (1991). In Deadly Earnest: The Missouri Brigade. Columbia, Missouri: Missouri River Press. ISBN 0-9631136-1-5.
- Kennedy, Frances H., ed. (1998). The Civil War Battlefield Guide (2nd ed.). Boston/New York: Houghton Mifflin. ISBN 978-0-395-74012-5.
- McGhee, James E. (2008). Guide to Missouri Confederate Regiments, 1861–1865. Fayetteville, Arkansas: University of Arkansas Press. ISBN 978-1-55728-870-7.
- Shea, William L.; Hess, Earl J. (1992). Pea Ridge: Civil War Campaign in the West. Chapel Hill, North Carolina: University of North Carolina Press. ISBN 0-8078-4669-4.
- Smith, Timothy B. (2012) [2006]. Champion Hill: Decisive Battle for Vicksburg. El Dorado Hills, California: Savas Beatie. ISBN 978-1-932714-19-7.
- Tucker, Phillip Thomas (1993). The South's Finest: The First Missouri Confederate Brigade From Pea Ridge to Vicksburg. Shippensburg, Pennsylvania: White Mane Publishing Co. ISBN 0-942597-31-1.
