= 22nd Mississippi Infantry Regiment =

- Active: 1861–1865
- Disbanded: April 26, 1865
- Country: Confederate States
- Allegiance: Mississippi
- Branch: Confederate States Army
- Type: Infantry
- Size: Regiment
- Battles: American Civil War: Battle of Shiloh; Siege of Corinth; Battle of Baton Rouge (1862); Second Battle of Corinth; Battle of Champion Hill; Jackson Expedition; Atlanta campaign; Franklin-Nashville Campaign; Carolinas campaign

The 22nd Mississippi Infantry Regiment was a unit of the Confederate States Army from Mississippi during the American Civil War. The regiment took part in numerous battles of the Vicksburg and Atlanta campaigns in the Western Theater before disbanding at the time of the Confederate surrender in 1865.

== History ==
The 22nd Mississippi was organized from volunteer companies assembled at Iuka in the summer of 1861 and was then sent north to Kentucky in September to join General Leonidas Polk's forces. The regiment went into winter quarters in Kentucky without seeing combat, but outbreaks of disease led to numerous deaths, including the original colonel of the regiment, D.W.C. Bonham, who died of pneumonia in November. Following the Confederate defeat at Fort Donelson, the regiment retreated to Tennessee and then returned to Mississippi.

In the spring of 1862, the 22nd fought its first battle at Shiloh, suffering major casualties, including the commanding officer of the regiment Col. Frank Schaller, who was seriously wounded. Following losses from disease during the winter in Kentucky and battle losses at Shiloh, the regiment was reduced from an original strength of nearly 1000 to only 520 men available for duty in May 1862.

The regiment then took part in the defense of Corinth, as Union troops moved to seize the vital North Mississippi railroad junction located there. Following the Confederate retreat, the regiment moved to Vicksburg, Mississippi to guard the strategic river city. From this location, the regiment was sent into Louisiana and took part in the Confederate attempt to recapture the state capital during the Battle of Baton Rouge. This attack failed and the Confederates again took heavy casualties.

During the fall of 1862, Confederate general Earl Van Dorn tried to retake Corinth, and the 22nd Regiment took part in the bloody Confederate assault on the fortified Union lines at the Second Battle of Corinth. This attempt failed, and the 22nd returned to Mississippi river region.

In the spring of 1863, the regiment joined the Confederate defenders during Vicksburg Campaign, fighting against Union forces who were seeking to capture the city along the Mississippi River. The regiment remained outside the city's defenses, fighting at the Battle of Champion Hill and along the Big Black River, and was not captured when Vicksburg fell on July 4. The 22nd then took part in the Confederate retreat to Jackson, and then was sent to Georgia to join the defense of Atlanta as part of General Winfield S. Featherston's brigade.

The 22nd fought in numerous battles around Atlanta before the Confederates lost control of the city, then moved on to join General John Bell Hood's Franklin-Nashville Campaign. By the end of December, 1864 the regiment had been reduced to a strength of only 104 men.

Following a retreat from Tennessee, and after spending the winter in camp in Mississippi, the 22nd moved into the Carolinas in the spring of 1865 to take part in their final campaign of the war. After fighting at Kinston and Bentonville, the regiment surrendered on April 26 at Durham, North Carolina.

== Commanders ==
Commanders of the 22nd Mississippi Infantry:

- Col. D.W.C. Bonham, died of illness November, 1861.
- Col. Frank Schaller, wounded at Shiloh.
- Col. James D. Lester
- Lt. Col. James S. Prestidge
- Lt. Col. H.J. Reid
- Lt. Col. Charles G. Nelms

== Organization ==
Companies of the 22nd Mississippi Infantry:

- Company A, "Mississippi Greys", of Lawrence County.
- Company B, "Hinds Light Guards", of Hinds County.
- Company C, "Sarsfield Southrons" of Vicksburg.
- Company D, "Rodney Guards", of Jefferson County.
- Company E, "Liberty Guards" of Amite County.
- Company F, "De Soto Rebels" of De Soto County.
- Company G, "Black Hawk Rifles" of Carroll County.
- Company H, "Lafayette Farmers" of Lafayette County.
- Company I, "Swamp Rangers" of Washington County.
- Company K, "Pegues Defenders" of Lafayette County.

== See also ==
- List of Mississippi Civil War Confederate units
