= James McCown =

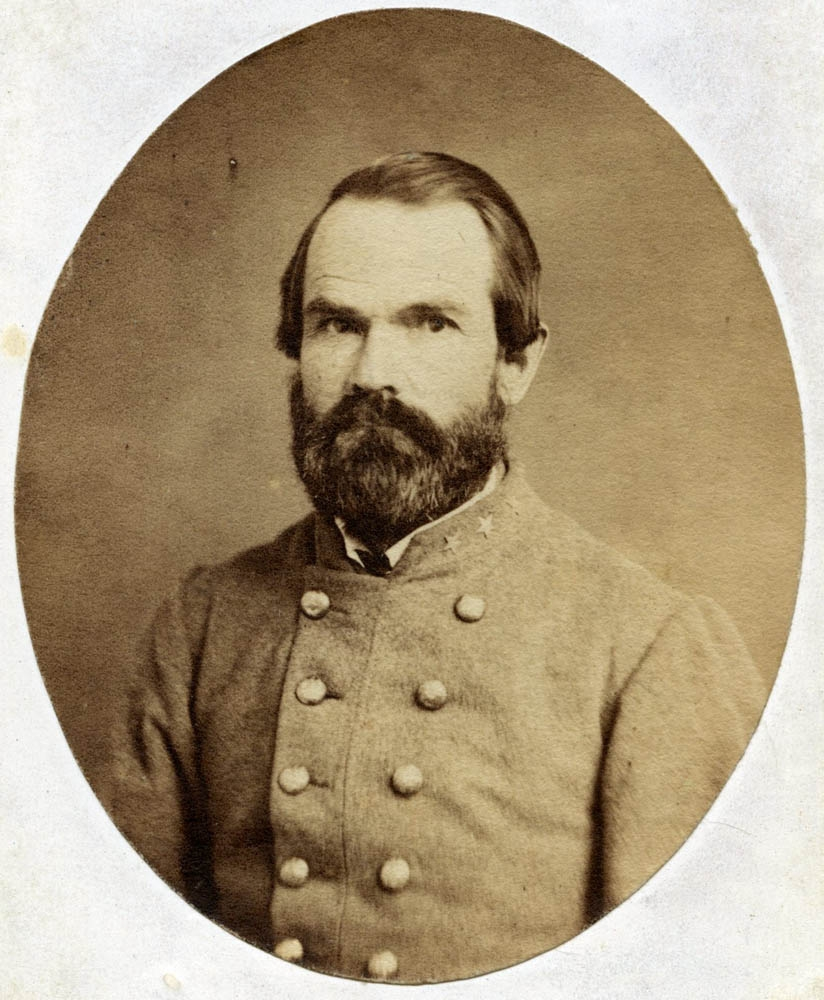

James McCown (March 21, 1817, Virginia – July 8, 1867, Warrensburg, Missouri) was a Confederate States Army officer in the American Civil War.

== Early life ==
James Madison McCown was born and raised in Kanawha County, West Virginia (then part of Virginia). He worked on riverboats on the Ohio River and was a militia captain. McCown, a Southern Methodist, married Caroline McCown in Kanawha County (the couple eventually had three daughters and six sons, some of whom later served with McCown in the Missouri Militia).

They moved to Missouri, first to Henry County, Missouri and then to Warrensburg, where McCown became a leading citizen and clerk of the county court and circuit court in Johnson County. In 1857 McCown won appointment as a bureaucrat serving the state legislature and moved for a while to the state capital.

With the coming of the secession crisis, political passions ran high in border-state Missouri. In 1860 McCown was the regular Democratic nominee for county clerk and was defeated in the election by Independent Democrat Marsh Foster (along with Whig candidate F. S. Poston). When Missouri was to elect representatives to a state constitutional convention to decide whether or not to secede, Foster supported Unionist Aikman Welch. On the afternoon of election day, February 18, 1861 McCown and his son William became involved in a political argument at the Warrentown courthouse which turned into a gunfight, and Marsh Foster was shot dead. James and William McCown were arrested for murder but only William McCown was indicted.

== Confederate command ==
At the start of the Civil War, McCown joined the Missouri State Guard (Confederate allied), becoming colonel of the 2nd Cavalry Regiment of the 8th Division. McCown enlisted with his sons, William, James, and Charles. When the State Guard was dissolved after Missouri's entry into the Confederacy, McCown then served in the First Missouri Confederate Infantry Battalion, first as a private but within three months being elected the battalion's lieutenant colonel.

The 5th Regiment of Missouri Infantry was formed at Saltillo, Mississippi on September 1, 1862, as part of the 1st Missouri Brigade of the Army of the West. McCown (by then commanding a five-company battalion of western Missourians which constituted about half of the new regiment) was elected its colonel. Robert Bevier was his lieutenant colonel.

== Civil War Campaigns ==
The 5th Regiment was involved in nearly continuous combat during the war. McCown led the 5th Regiment in its battles around Corinth and in the Vicksburg Campaign, at Iuka, Corinth, Port Gibson, Champion Hill, and Big Black River.

The 5th Regiment was captured en masse at the fall of Vicksburg on July 4, 1863, and McCown was taken prisoner. He was exchanged and assumed command of a regiment consolidated from the remnants and exchanged prisoners from 5th Regiment, and the 3rd Infantry Regiment. McCown led this consolidated regiment, now part of John Bell Hood's army, in the Atlanta campaign and the Franklin–Nashville Campaign, where it fought at the Battle of Allatoona.

McCowen and the regiment were then transferred to the defense of Mobile. There he commanded the Missouri Brigade and fought in the Battle of Fort Blakeley, being surrendered as part of the garrison on April 9, 1865.

== Continuation of Johnson County feud ==
During the Civil War, Marsh Foster's brother, Emory S. Foster, led the Unionist 7th Missouri State Militia Cavalry in a raid where they burned down McCown's home.

Among the Unionists involved in the Johnson County political disputes leading to the assassination of Foster was Brinkly Hornsby, a Unionist from East Tennessee. After the war, Hornsby brought suit against McCown (along with Sterling Price, James S. Rains, Jeremiah V. Cockrell, and others) for false imprisonment by the rebel soldiers in 1861. Sterling Price was the leader of the Confederate Missouri State Guard, and Raines and Cockerell were fellow officers in the 8th Division.

McCown's feud with the Fosters did not end with his death; twenty years later, his son, William, was murdered in retaliation for Foster's death.

== Post Civil War ==
After the Civil War, McCown returned to Warrensburg, where he died of typhoid fever on July 5 or July 8, 1867. Caroline died August 28, 1915.
