= Landis's Missouri Battery =

Artillery battery of the Confederate States Army

Landis's Battery Landis's Company, Missouri Light Artillery
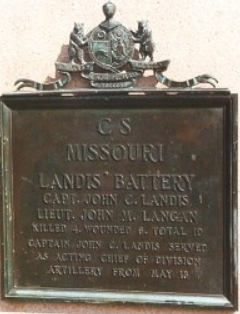
- Plaque commemorating Landis's Missouri Battery at Vicksburg National Military Park
- Active: January 1862 – October 1, 1863
- Country: Confederate States of America
- Branch: Confederate States Army
- Type: Artillery
- Size: 62 (May 1862); 37 (July 4, 1863)
- Equipment: 2 × 12-pounder Napoleon field guns 2 × 24-pounder howizters
- Engagements: American Civil War: Battle of Pea Ridge (Note: Archaeological evidence suggests that the battery was present, although it is also claimed that the battery was not with the Army of the West during the battle.); Battle of Iuka; Second Battle of Corinth; Vicksburg campaign

Landis's Missouri Battery, also known as Landis's Company, Missouri Light Artillery, was an artillery battery that served in the Confederate States Army during the early stages of the American Civil War. The battery was formed when Captain John C. Landis recruited men from the Missouri State Guard in late 1861 and early 1862. The battery fielded two 12-pounder Napoleon field guns and two 24-pounder howitzers for much of its existence, and had a highest reported strength of 62 men. After initially serving in the Trans-Mississippi Theater, where it may have fought in the Battle of Pea Ridge, it was transferred east of the Mississippi River. The battery saw limited action in 1862 at the Battle of Iuka and at the Second Battle of Corinth.

In 1863, the battery was transferred to Grand Gulf, Mississippi, a key point on the Mississippi River. After Major General Ulysses S. Grant landed Union infantry at Bruinsburg, Landis's Battery formed part of Confederate defenses at the battles of Port Gibson in early May, after which Landis was promoted and Lieutenant John M. Langan took command. Later that month, the battery took part in the Battle of Champion Hill, and on May 17 helped cover a Confederate retreat after the Battle of Big Black River Bridge. It next saw action during the siege of Vicksburg, helping repulse Union assaults on May 22. Landis's Battery was captured when the Confederate garrison of Vicksburg surrendered on July 4. Although the surviving men of the battery were exchanged, the battery was not reorganized after Vicksburg; instead, it was absorbed into Guibor's Missouri Battery along with Wade's Missouri Battery.

== Background ==
In the United States during the early 19th century, a large cultural divide developed between the Northern States and the Southern States over the issue of slavery. By the time of the 1860 United States presidential election, slavery had become one of the defining features of southern culture, with the ideology of states' rights being used to defend the institution. Eventually, many southerners decided that secession was the only way to preserve slavery, especially after abolitionist Abraham Lincoln was elected president in 1860. His candidacy was regionally successful, as much of his support was from the Northern States; he received no electoral votes from the Deep South. Many southerners rejected the legitimacy of Lincoln's election, and promoted secession. On December 20, 1860, the state of South Carolina seceded, and the states of Mississippi, Florida, Alabama, Georgia, Louisiana, and Texas followed suit in early 1861. On February 4, the seceding states formed the Confederate States of America; Jefferson Davis became the nascent state's president.

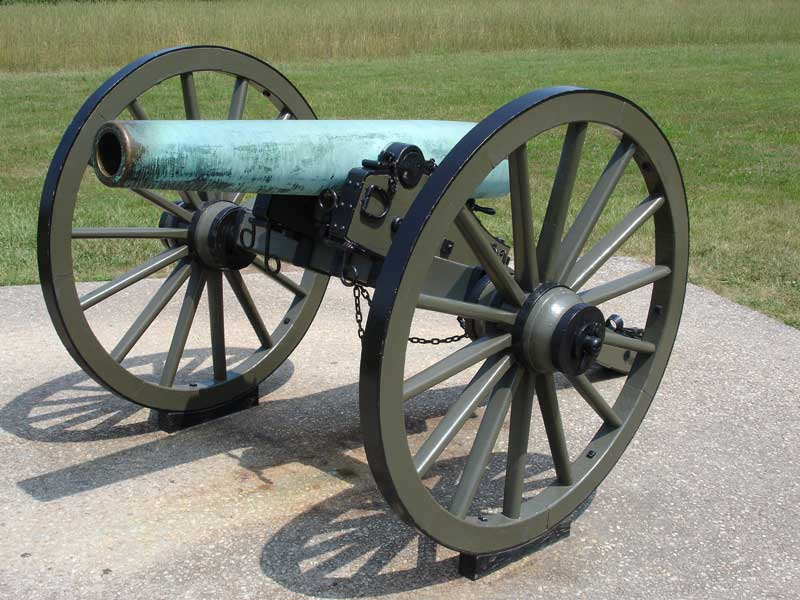
12-pounder Napoleon cannon, similar to those issued to the battery

In Charleston Harbor, South Carolina, the military installation of Fort Sumter was still held by a Union Army garrison. On the morning of April 12, the Confederates fired on Fort Sumter, beginning the American Civil War. The fort surrendered the next day. Shortly after the attack, Lincoln requested that the states remaining in the Union provide 75,000 volunteers; in the coming weeks Virginia, North Carolina, Tennessee, and Arkansas joined the Confederacy. A Union army commanded by Brigadier General Irvin McDowell moved south into Virginia and attacked two Confederate armies commanded by Brigadier Generals P. G. T. Beauregard and Joseph E. Johnston on July 21. In the ensuing First Battle of Bull Run, the Union army was routed.

Meanwhile, the state of Missouri was politically divided. The state legislature voted against secession, but Governor Claiborne F. Jackson supported it. Jackson decided to mobilize the state militia to a point outside of St. Louis, where the St. Louis Arsenal was located. Brigadier General Nathaniel Lyon, the commander of the arsenal, moved to disperse the militiamen on May 10 in the Camp Jackson affair; a pro-secession riot in St. Louis followed. In turn, Jackson created the Missouri State Guard as a new militia organization, appointing Major General Sterling Price as the organization's commander on May 12. (Note: Price's commission was in the Missouri State Guard, not the Confederate States Army.) After a June 11 meeting between Lyon, Jackson, Price, and United States Representative Francis P. Blair Jr. failed to lead to a peaceable compromise, Lyon moved against the state capital of Jefferson City, ejecting Jackson and the pro-secession elements of the state legislature on June 15.

Two days later, the Missouri State Guard suffered another defeat at the hands of Lyon, this time at the Battle of Boonville, which led Jackson and Price to withdraw to southwestern Missouri. Lyon pursued, although a portion of his command, under Colonel Franz Sigel, was defeated at the Battle of Carthage on July 5. Price was reinforced by Confederate States Army troops commanded by Brigadier General Benjamin McCulloch; the latter commanded the combined force. On August 10, Lyon attacked the Confederate camp near Wilsons Creek. Lyon's plan in the ensuing Battle of Wilson's Creek was a pincer attack, with Lyon leading the main Union body to attack one side of the Confederate camp, and Sigel swinging a column around to attack the Confederate rear. The plan failed as Sigel was routed and Lyon was killed; the Union troops retreated all the way to Rolla after the defeat. Price followed up the Confederate victory at Wilson's Creek by driving north towards the Missouri River. On September 13, the Missouri State Guard encountered Union troops near Lexington; the city was soon placed under siege. The Union garrison surrendered on September 20, ending the siege of Lexington. However, Major General John C. Frémont concentrated Union troops near Tipton, threatening Price's position. In turn, Price withdrew to Neosho in the southwestern part of the state. On November 3, Jackson and the pro-secession elements of the state legislature voted to secede and join the Confederate States of America as a government-in-exile; the anti-secession elements of the legislature had voted against secession in July.

== Service history ==
=== 1862 ===
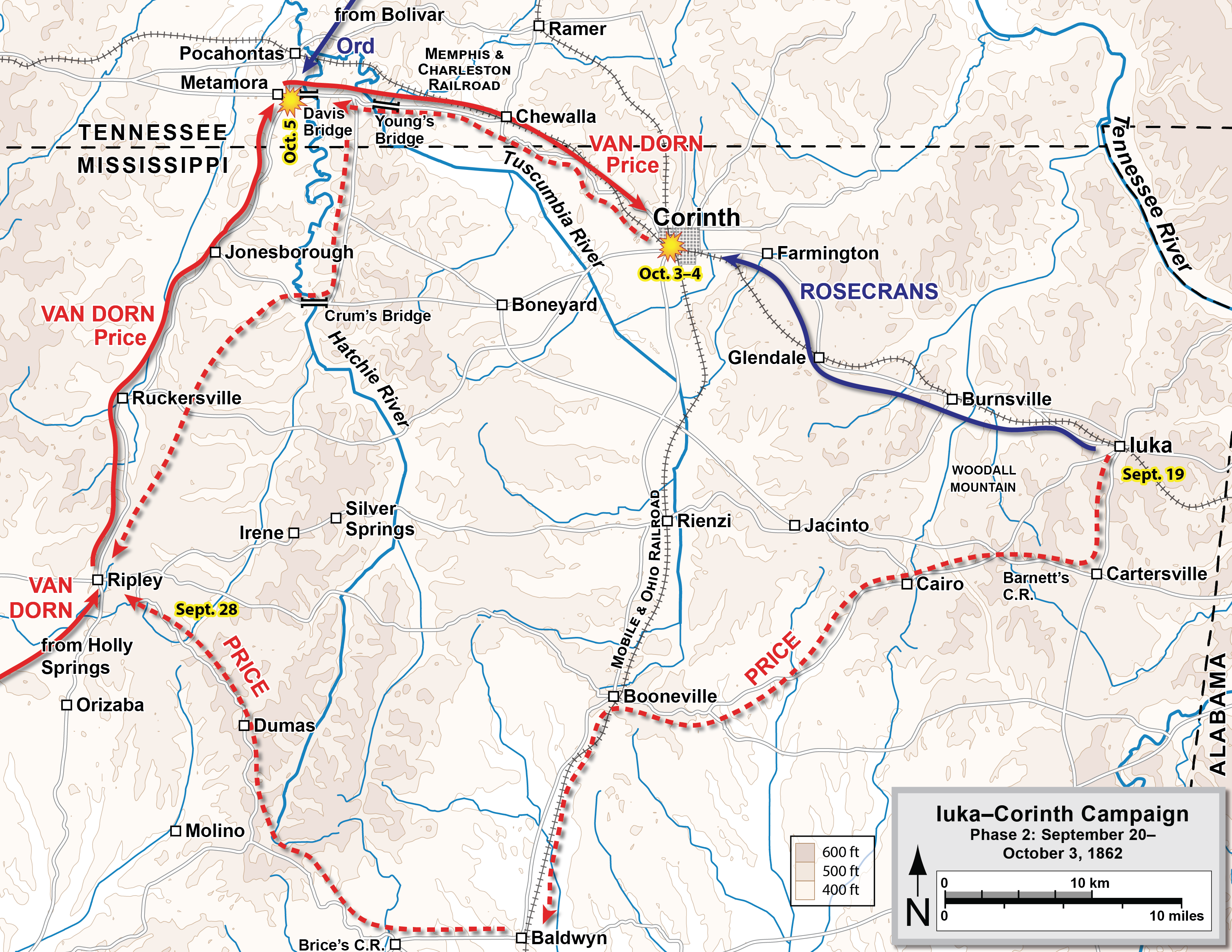
Map of the Iuka–Corinth campaign

Captain John C. Landis, formerly an officer in the Missouri State Guard, was authorized in December 1861 to recruit an artillery battery for official service in the Confederate States Army. Landis's recruiting operations were centered near Osceola, Missouri, and the men recruited were former members of the Missouri State Guard. Despite not being able to enlist enough men to bring the battery to full strength, it traveled to Des Arc, Arkansas, in January 1862 to be equipped with cannons. The battery was assigned two 12-pounder Napoleon field guns and two 24-pounder howitzers; all four cannons were made of brass. The battery joined the Army of the West in March 1862 after the Battle of Pea Ridge; more men then joined it. Archaeological evidence suggests at least a portion of the battery was engaged at Pea Ridge, as part of a cannonball that could have been fired only from a 24-pounder howitzer was recovered at Pea Ridge National Military Park in 2001. As Landis's Battery was the only Confederate artillery battery armed with 24-pounder howitzers to serve west of the Mississippi River, this would indicate that at least a portion of the battery participated in the fighting, likely as part of Brigadier General William Y. Slack's brigade. However, other sources indicate that the battery did not see action in the battle. Around this time, the battery was assigned to Brigadier General Daniel M. Frost's artillery brigade and followed the rest of the Army of the West across the Mississippi River in mid-April.

On May 1, 1862, while stationed in the vicinity of Memphis, Tennessee, the battery officially elected its officers. A muster conducted on May 5 at Corinth, Mississippi, found 62 men in the battery; the muster also noted that the battery was armed with four cannons. Union troops had previously occupied positions near the city on May 3, beginning the siege of Corinth. The battery also fought in a skirmish in the vicinity on May 28, which left two soldiers wounded, before the Confederates abandoned the city on the night of May 29/30. Landis's Battery spent the next several months stationed at various points in Mississippi. In September 1862, Price, now commanding the Army of the West, was preparing for an offensive designed to support the Confederate Heartland Offensive. On September 14, Price occupied Iuka, Mississippi, as part of this offensive; additional Confederate forces under the command of Major General Earl Van Dorn were only a four-days' march away. Major General Ulysses S. Grant, one of the top Union commanders in the region, wanted to avoid the possibility of Price and Van Dorn joining forces. To accomplish this, Grant sent troops commanded by Major General E. O. C. Ord to attack Iuka from the north, and others under Major General William Rosecrans to attack the city from the south. During the ensuing Battle of Iuka on September 19, Landis's Battery fought as part of Brigadier General Martin E. Green's brigade, assigned to Brigadier General Lewis Henry Little's division of the Army of the West. Although the battery came under hostile fire at Iuka, it did not fire its cannons. Price was able to fend off Rosecrans, and an acoustic shadow prevented Ord from learning of the fight until it was over. By September 20, the Army of the West had escaped from Iuka.

Price and Van Dorn then joined forces; Van Dorn commanded the combined army, as he had seniority over Price, who was relegated to corps command. Rosecrans responded to the Confederate consolidation by moving his army to Corinth on October 2. The Union position at Corinth consisted of an exterior line of fortifications built by the Confederates earlier in the war and a new inner line built as the result of orders by Major General Henry Halleck. On October 3, Van Dorn attacked, beginning the Second Battle of Corinth. Landis's Battery was part of Green's brigade of Brigadier General Louis Hébert's division of Price's corps during the battle. During the battle, Landis's Battery continued to operate two 12-pounders and two 24-pounders. On the first day at Corinth, Landis's Battery, as well as Guibor's Missouri Battery, participated in an artillery duel with two Union batteries from the 1st Missouri Light Artillery: Battery I and Battery K. After two more Confederate artillery batteries joined the fighting, the Union artillery was forced to withdraw, allowing the infantry of Green's brigade to attack the Union line. Later that day, while the Confederate infantry was still fighting along the Union main line, Union infantry approached the Confederate flank, and advanced towards Landis's and Guibor's batteries. Artillery fire from the two batteries stopped the progress of the Union advance, and the Union infantry withdrew as darkness began to fall.

The Confederate infantry assaults on October 3 had driven Rosecrans's men from the outer line, but the inner line was still in Union hands. Van Dorn ordered another assault for the next day. The October 4 fighting briefly carried portions of the inner Union line, but the gains could not be held. The Confederates withdrew from Corinth that night in defeat, with Landis's Battery having suffered ten casualties. It formed part of the Confederate rear guard, and avoided capture at the Battle of Davis Bridge. The battery's equipment had been damaged during the Corinth campaign, so it was detached to Jackson, Mississippi, for repairs. On November 29, Landis's men rejoined the Army of the West and they spent the rest of 1862 at Grenada, Mississippi.

=== 1863 ===
The Vicksburg campaign

On January 27, 1863, the battery was transferred to Grand Gulf, Mississippi, joining the defenses on the Big Black River. While stationed at Grand Gulf, the battery participated in several minor engagements with Union gunboats, although some of the artillerymen reported boredom. In mid-March, the battery guarded a point known as Winkler's Bluff on the Big Black River, with orders to allow no boats to pass. On April 29, Union Navy vessels commanded by Admiral David Dixon Porter bombarded the Confederate position at Grand Gulf, resulting in the Battle of Grand Gulf, although Landis's Battery was not part of the Confederate front line. One fort held out, so Grant landed downriver at Bruinsburg with 24,000 men. These soon moved east from the river, leading Brigadier General John S. Bowen, the Confederate commander at Grand Gulf, to send a blocking force to Port Gibson in an attempt to stop the incursion. During the morning of May 1, Landis's Battery's two howitzers and their crews were sent to join the blocking force. During the Battle of Port Gibson, the battery fired at men of Major General John McClernand's Union corps and engaged in an artillery duel with the 8th Michigan Light Artillery, suffering three casualties during the fighting. It was late afternoon before the battery disengaged. At one point in the battle, the battery was also subjected to Union sharpshooter fire, before dispersing their attackers with canister. Despite it holding initially, Union pressure eventually drove in Bowen's right, causing the Confederates to retreat before Grant outflanked them. After Port Gibson, the Confederates were forced to abandon their position at Grand Gulf on May 3; Landis's Battery again served as part of a rear guard.

Meanwhile, Grant was faced with a choice: he could approach Vicksburg from either the south or the east. An attack from the south presented a more direct path to the city, but an advance from the east presented the better chance of a complete envelopment of Lieutenant General John C. Pemberton's garrison at Vicksburg, so Grant decided on the latter route. On May 12, Union troops brushed aside Confederate resistance at the Battle of Raymond before moving against Jackson, where Confederate General Joseph E. Johnston was positioned with 6,000 men. Grant attacked the city on May 14, and a Union victory in the ensuing Battle of Jackson forced Johnston out of the city, preventing him from reinforcing Pemberton. In turn, Johnston ordered Pemberton to move east and take the offensive. On May 16, Confederate Brigadier General Stephen D. Lee encountered elements of Grant's army during the move east, beginning the Battle of Champion Hill. Landis was acting as Bowen's divisional artillery commander, and Lieutenant John M. Langan commanded the battery at Champion Hill. During the battle, Landis's Battery provided artillery support for the Confederate center.

Initially Landis's and Wade's batteries fired on Union skirmishers, temporarily dispersing them. The 17th Ohio Battery then arrived on the field, and began firing on the Confederate batteries. Landis's and Wade's guns lacked the range to effectively return fire, and the Ohioans had the better of the exchange, as Landis's two howitzers were disabled. The infantrymen of Bowen's Division made an attack against the Union line, and some of the Confederate artillery, including Landis's Battery, moved forward to support the assault. At one point, Landis ordered the men to fire a shell into the path of a retreating Confederate regiment in an attempt to force the men to rally. At Champion Hill, Landis's Battery suffered either five or nine casualties. Four of the losses were inflicted by a single shell fired by the 17th Ohio Battery. Pemberton's entire army retreated from the field later that day. A Confederate division commanded by Major General William W. Loring had become separated from the rest of the Confederate force during the retreat, leading Pemberton to order Bowen's division and a brigade commanded by Brigadier General John C. Vaughn to hold the crossing of the Big Black River in hopes that Loring could rejoin the main Confederate force.

The next day, the battery was present at the Battle of Big Black River Bridge. The battery was positioned on the opposite side of the river from the main Confederate line. The historian James McGhee says the two pieces damaged at Champion Hill were not present at this action. The battery across the river helped cover the Confederate retreat, then entered the fortifications of Vicksburg. (Note: Loring never rejoined Pemberton's force.) During the siege of Vicksburg, some of the artillerymen served as sharpshooters due to a shortage of cannons. Over the course of the siege, the battery suffered either ten, eleven, or thirteen casualties during a 47-day span of mostly continuous fighting. The Confederates surrendered Vicksburg on July 4, and Landis's Battery was captured at this time. The 37 men left in the battery were released on parole until they were exchanged; they were then ordered to Demopolis, Alabama. On October 1, Landis's Battery and Wade's Missouri Battery were absorbed by Guibor's Battery; Landis's Battery ceased to exist as a separate unit. About 75 men served with the battery throughout the war, which reported the deaths of 22 of its members. Of these, fifteen were the result of battle, six died from disease and one man was murdered.

== See also ==
- List of Missouri Confederate Civil War units

== Sources ==
- Ballard, Michael B. (2004). Vicksburg: The Campaign that Opened the Mississippi. Chapel Hill, North Carolina: University of North Carolina Press. ISBN 978-0-8078-2893-9.
- Barr, Alwyn (Autumn 1963). "Confederate Artillery in Arkansas". The Arkansas Historical Quarterly. 22 (3). Arkansas Historical Association: 238–272. doi:10.2307/40007663. ISSN 0004-1823. JSTOR 40007663.
- Bearss, Edwin C. (1991a) [1986]. The Campaign for Vicksburg. Vol. II: Grant Strikes a Fatal Blow. Dayton, Ohio: Morningside Bookshop. ISBN 0-89029-313-9.
- Bearss, Edwin C. (1991b) [1986]. The Campaign for Vicksburg. Vol. III: Unvexed to the Sea. Dayton, Ohio: Morningside Bookshop. ISBN 0-89029-516-6.
- Bearss, Edwin C. (2007) [2006]. Fields of Honor: Pivotal Battles of the Civil War (1st paperback ed.). Washington, D.C.: National Geographic. ISBN 978-1-4262-0093-9.
- Coleman, D. C. (1903). Report of the Commission Appointed by the Governor to Determine the Position of the Missouri Troops at Vicksburg, 1901–1902 (PDF). Jefferson City, Missouri: Tribune Printing Company. OCLC 18496035.
- Cozzens, Peter (1997). The Darkest Days of the War: The Battles of Iuka and Corinth. Chapel Hill, North Carolina: University of North Carolina Press. ISBN 978-0-8078-2320-0.
- Gottschalk, Phil (1991). In Deadly Earnest: The Missouri Brigade. Columbia, Missouri: Missouri River Press. ISBN 978-0-9631136-1-0.
- Holmes, Richard (2001). The Oxford Companion to Military History. Oxford: Oxford University Press. ISBN 978-0-19-866209-9.
- Kennedy, Frances H., ed. (1998). The Civil War Battlefield Guide (2nd ed.). Boston/New York: Houghton Mifflin. ISBN 978-0-395-74012-5.
- Kountz, John S. (1901). Record of the Organizations Engaged in the Campaign, Siege, and Defense of Vicksburg (PDF). Washington, D.C.: Government Printing Office. OCLC 70751401.
- McGhee, James E. (2008). Guide to Missouri Confederate Regiments, 1861–1865. Fayetteville, Arkansas: University of Arkansas Press. ISBN 978-1-55728-870-7.
- Smith, Timothy B. (2012) [2006]. Champion Hill: Decisive Battle for Vicksburg. El Dorado Hills, California: Savas Beatie. ISBN 978-1-932714-19-7.
- Tucker, Phillip Thomas (1993). The South's Finest: The First Missouri Confederate Brigade From Pea Ridge to Vicksburg. Shippensburg, Pennsylvania: White Mane Publishing Co. ISBN 978-0-942597-31-8.
- Wright, William C. (1984). Archaeological Report No. 13: The Confederate Upper Battery Site, Grand Gulf, Mississippi Excavations 1982 (PDF). Jackson, Mississippi: Mississippi Department of Archives and History. ISBN 978-0-938896-38-8.
