= Francis Cockrell =

American politician (1834–1915)

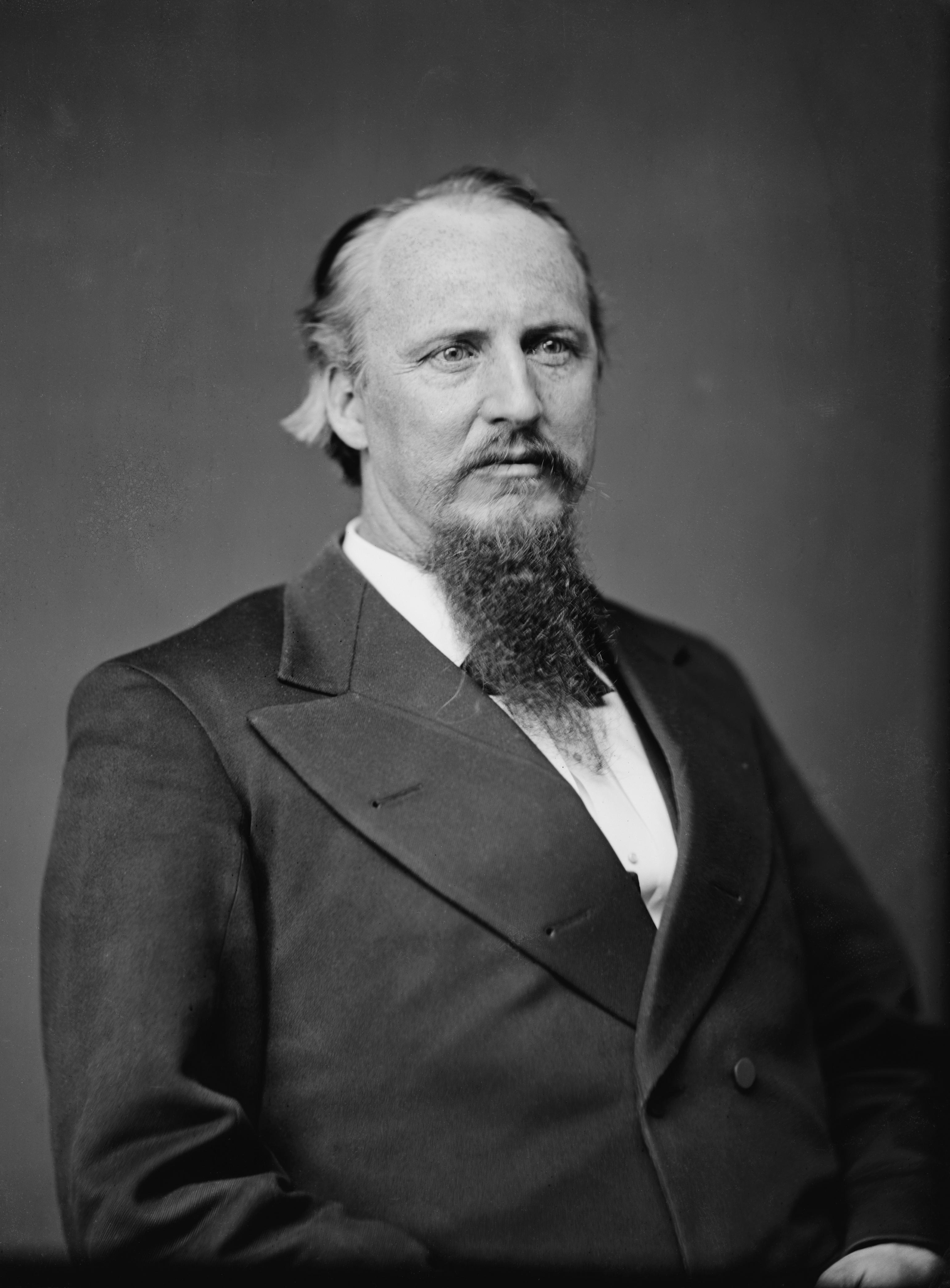

United States Senator from Missouri
- In office March 4, 1875 – March 3, 1905
- Preceded by: Carl Schurz
- Succeeded by: William Warner

Personal details
- Born: Francis Marion Cockrell; October 1, 1834 Warrensburg, Missouri
- Died: December 13, 1915 (aged 81) Washington, D.C.
- Party: Democratic

Military service
- Allegiance: Confederate States of America
- Branch/service: Confederate States Army
- Years of service: 1861–1865 (CSA)
- Rank: Brigadier General
- Unit: 1st Missouri Infantry Regiment
- Commands: 2nd Missouri Infantry Regiment; First Missouri Brigade; French's Division
- Battles/wars: American Civil War

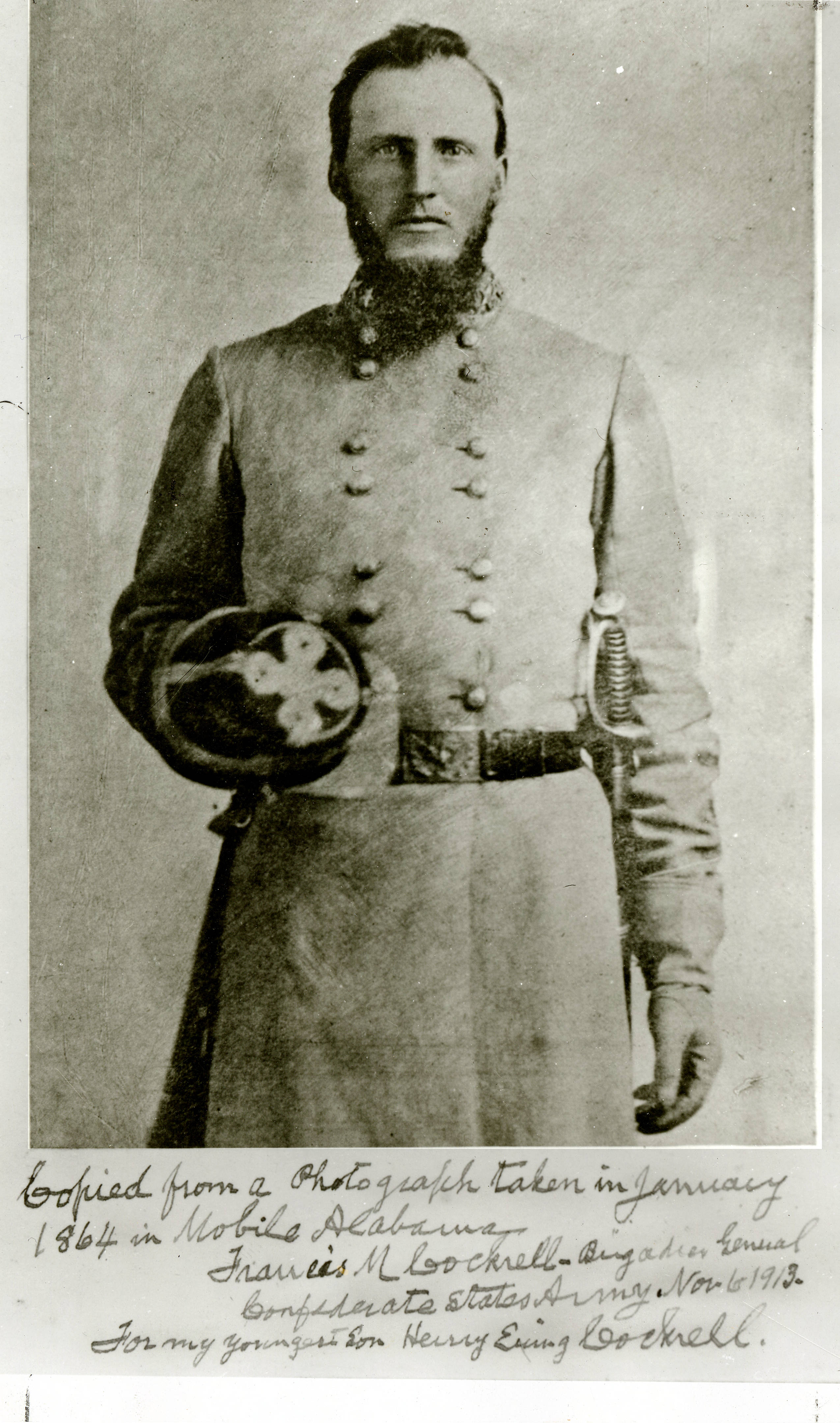
Cockrell in military uniform, January 1864

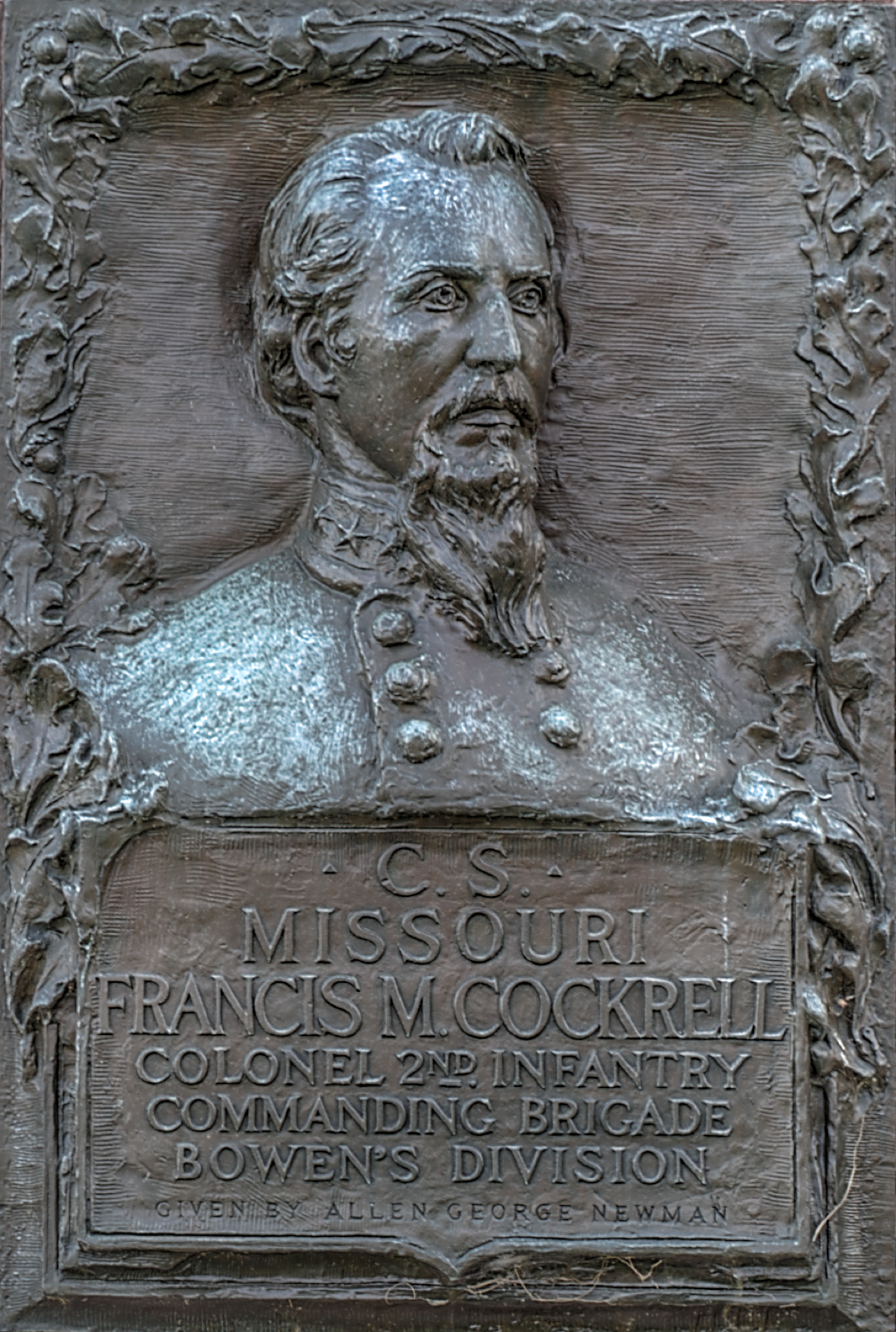
Relief portrait by Allen George Newman at Vicksburg National Military Park

Francis Marion Cockrell (October 1, 1834 – December 13, 1915) was a Confederate military commander and American politician from the state of Missouri. He served as a United States senator from Missouri for five terms. He was a prominent member of the famed South–Cockrell–Hargis family of Southern politicians.

== Early life and family ==
Cockrell was born in Warrensburg, Missouri, the son of Nancy (Ellis) and Joseph Cockrell, the sheriff of Johnson County. His older brother was Jeremiah Vardaman Cockrell, who was a congressman from Texas in the 1890s. Francis Cockrell attended local schools and Chapel Hill College in Lafayette County, Missouri, graduating in July 1853; He studied law and was admitted to the bar in 1855, practicing law in Warrensburg until the outbreak of the Civil War.

Cockrell was married three times. His first wife, Arthusa Dorcas Stapp (1830–1859), with whom he had three sons. His second wife, Anna E. Mann (1840–1871) of Kentucky, died of consumption. In July 1873, he married Anna Ewing (1846–1894), the eldest daughter of Judge Ephraim Brevard Ewing from Missouri.

== Civil War ==
At the beginning of the American Civil War in 1861, Cockrell joined the Missouri State Guard as a Captain. After being mustered into the Confederate States Army in the 2nd Missouri Regiment in early 1862 (which was formed as the 1st, but renumbered as Bowen had already formed a regiment); being promoted to colonel. Cockrell commanded a brigade in the Vicksburg Campaign. He distinguished himself at the Battle of Champion Hill, launching a counterattack that temporarily ousted troops of XVII Corps off the hill. He also took part in the Battle of Big Black River Bridge. His brigade was able to escape just before federal troops seized the bridge. He was wounded in the hand by an exploding shell during the Siege of Vicksburg.

Cockrell was promoted to brigadier general on July 18, 1863. He went on to fight in many of the battles of the 1864 Atlanta campaign, and participated in Hood's Tennessee Campaign later that year where he was wounded at the Battle of Franklin on November 30, 1864. In 1865, Cockrell commanded a division in defence of Fort Blakeley, Alabama. On April 9, 1865, shortly before the war ended, Cockrell was captured there but was paroled on May 14. Cockrell's First Missouri Brigade was considered one of the finest on either side, and Cockrell himself is widely recognized as one of the best combat brigadiers of the entire war. After the war ended, he returned to his law practice in Missouri.

== Postbellum career ==
In 1874, Cockrell, who became a member of the United States Democratic Party, was elected to the U.S. Senate from Missouri by the state legislature. His first and only elected office, he served in the Senate from 1875 to 1905, when he retired. He held several committee chairmanships, including the chairmanships of the Claims Committee, Engrossed Bills Committee and Appropriations Committee during his senate career. He received 42 votes for President of the United States at the 1904 Democratic National Convention, but was defeated by Alton B. Parker.

He was appointed to the Interstate Commerce Commission by President Theodore Roosevelt in 1905, serving in that capacity until 1910. In 1911, he was appointed commissioner to negotiate the boundaries between the state of Texas and the New Mexico Territory, which was about to become a state. In 1913, Woodrow Wilson appointed him as the civilian member on the Board of Ordnance and Fortifications for the War Department, where he served until his death in Washington, D.C.

== See also ==
- List of American Civil War generals (Confederate)

== Notes ==
U.S. Senate
Preceded by Carl Schurz	U.S. senator (Class 1) from Missouri; 1875–1905; Served alongside: Lewis V. Bogy, David H. Armstrong, James Shields, George G. Vest, William J. Stone	Succeeded by William Warner
