= First Missouri Brigade =

Infantry unit of the Confederate States Army

- Active: January 1862 to May 1865
- Allegiance: Confederate States of America
- Branch: Confederate States Army
- Type: Infantry
- Engagements: American Civil War: Battle of Pea Ridge; Battle of Iuka; Second Battle of Corinth; Battle of Port Gibson; Battle of Champion Hill; Battle of Big Black River Bridge; Siege of Vicksburg; Battle of Allatoona; Battle of Franklin; Battle of Fort Blakeley

The First Missouri Brigade was an infantry brigade that served in the Confederate States Army during the American Civil War. It was mostly recruited from members of the Missouri State Guard – a secessionist force formed from the Missouri Volunteer Militia when the allegiance of the state was disputed.

The brigade was first formed during the winter of 1861–62 as the first brigade of the division commanded by Sterling Price. It was initially led and drilled by Lewis Henry Little. In September 1862, Little was promoted to command of the division and the brigade was then commanded by Elijah Gates. In March 1863, Francis Cockrell took command of the brigade and led it for most of the remaining war. The unit had its last stand under Col. James McCown at the Battle of Fort Blakeley in April 1865.

== See also ==
- List of Missouri Confederate Civil War units
