= John T. McMurran =

19th-century American lawyer (1801–1866)

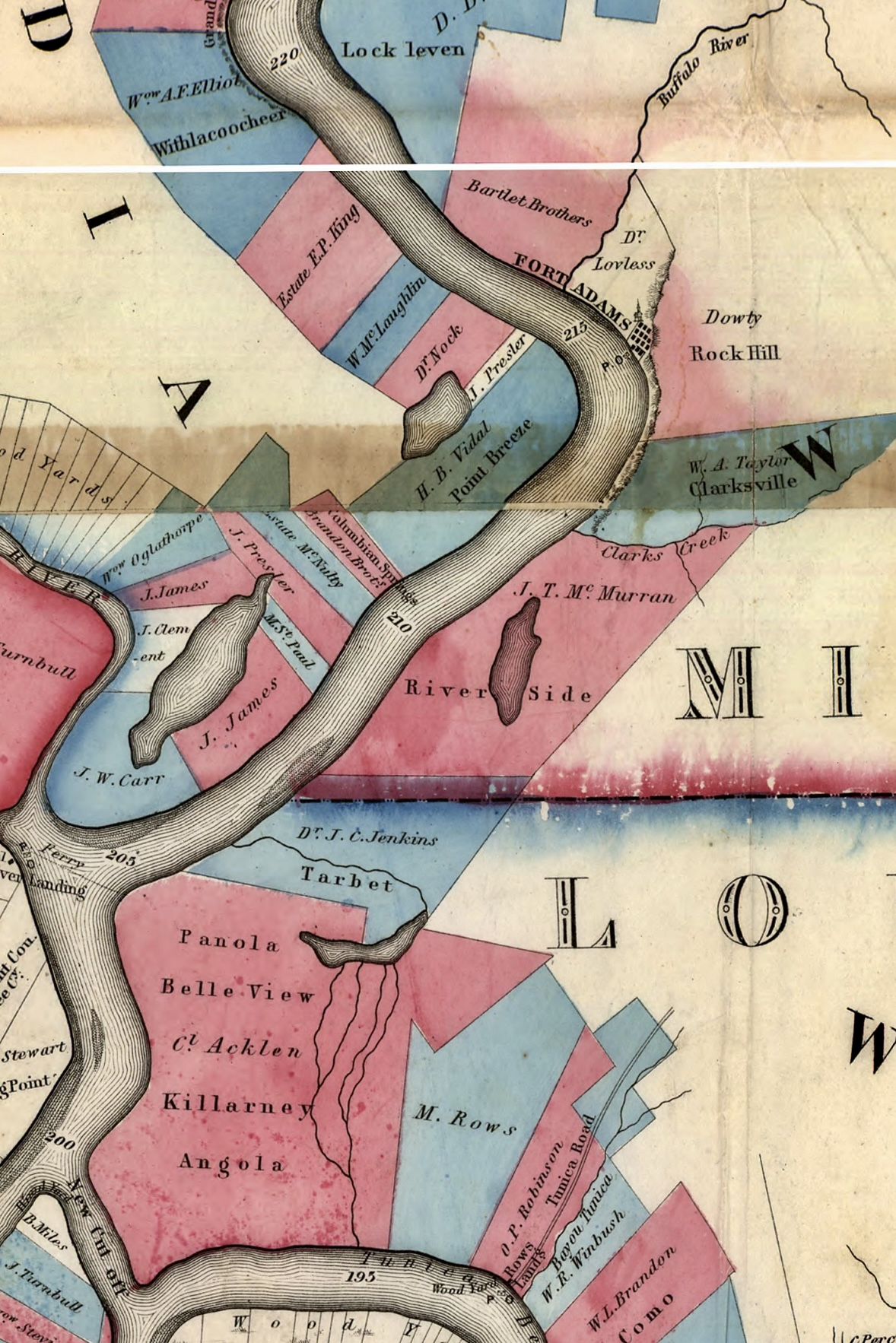
- Detail of Norman's chart of the lower Mississippi River showing J. T. McMurran's River Side plantation in Wilkinson County, Mississippi c. 1855, just north along the river above from the plantation complex that is now Angola Prison; Riverside was half of the former Clarksville plantation
- Born: April 21, 1801; Franklin County, Pennsylvania
- Died: December 30, 1866 (aged 65); New Orleans, Louisiana

John Thompson McMurran (April 29, 1801–December 30, 1866) was a 19th-century American lawyer and state legislator in Mississippi. McMurran & Quitman, a partnership with John A. Quitman, was once the largest law practice in southwest Mississippi before the American Civil War. According to historian Kimberly Welch, "As Ariela Gross shows, Natchez attorneys (who often became judges, planters, and politicians) were some of the most influential men in their communities and actively shaped the slave economy and the legal culture of the antebellum South." In addition to representing White clients McMurran and Quitman "represented Black clients (free and enslaved) in a wide range of cases, from freedom suits to debt actions to criminal cases." In later years, he also owned cotton plantations. He is perhaps best known today as the original owner of Melrose house in Natchez, presently part of the Natchez National Historical Park. McMurran was one of the 43 people killed as a result of the burning of the steamboat Fashion 50 miles (80 km) above Baton Rouge, Louisiana in December 1866.

== Biography ==
He was a native of Chambersburg, Pennsylvania. He first studied law in Chillicothe, Ohio, with his uncle "Judge Thompson". This is likely John Thompson, of the Ohio Middle District of Common Pleas, who later became a planter in Louisiana and died near Fort Adams, Mississippi in 1833. McMurran moved to Mississippi around 1822 to work as a teacher at Beach Hill Academy in Claiborne County, Mississippi. He lived in Claiborne and Holmes County before settling in Natchez.

He studied law while teaching and started practicing law in Mississippi in the 1820s. John A. Quitman was his on-again, off-again law partner. As retold in the Bench and Bar of Mississippi in 1881, "...he came to Natchez, Mississippi, about the year 1828, bearing a letter of introduction from his uncle to General John A. Quitman, who had resided a short while at Delaware, Ohio, prior to his advent to Mississippi, but was now a member of the distinguished firm of Griffith & Quitman, in Natchez, the most successful firm at that time in the State. In consequence of his letter of introduction, Mr. McMurran was engaged in the office of these gentlemen as a clerk, in which position the extensive business of the firm afforded him an ample opportunity for perfecting his knowledge of law, and for familiarizing himself with all the details of practice. Of this advantage he availed himself to such a degree that, upon the death of Mr. Griffith from yellow fever in 1829, he became the partner of General Quitman." William B. Griffith was his brother-in-law, as both married daughters of Edward Turner; and Quitman was married to their cousin, a daughter of Henry Turner.

In 1827 he was secretary for a committee devoted to honoring the late attorney general of Mississippi Richard Stockton. McMurran served at least one term in the Mississippi House of Representatives. According to one account, in 1832 he was one of a group of state legislators from the southern section of the state who resigned in protest of the admission to the legislature of representatives from the recently added Chickasaw cession lands in the northern half of the state. A special election was announced in October 1836 to fill a legislative seat that he had vacated. According to another source, he was elected to the state legislature in 1837 for a single term. Outside of these political positions, "the law was his chosen sphere, and to that he devoted all the energies of his character. He seems to have manifested but little ambition for political preferment."

In the late 1830s, when he was known as a man of "considerable wealth", he was a director of the four-branch Commercial Bank of Natchez, along with Henry Chotard and Aylette Buckner. In 1840, after the failure of the Mississippi Rail Road Company, Quitman rejoined McMurran's law practice. McMurran & Quitman was said to have been the largest law practice in southwest Mississippi before the American Civil War.

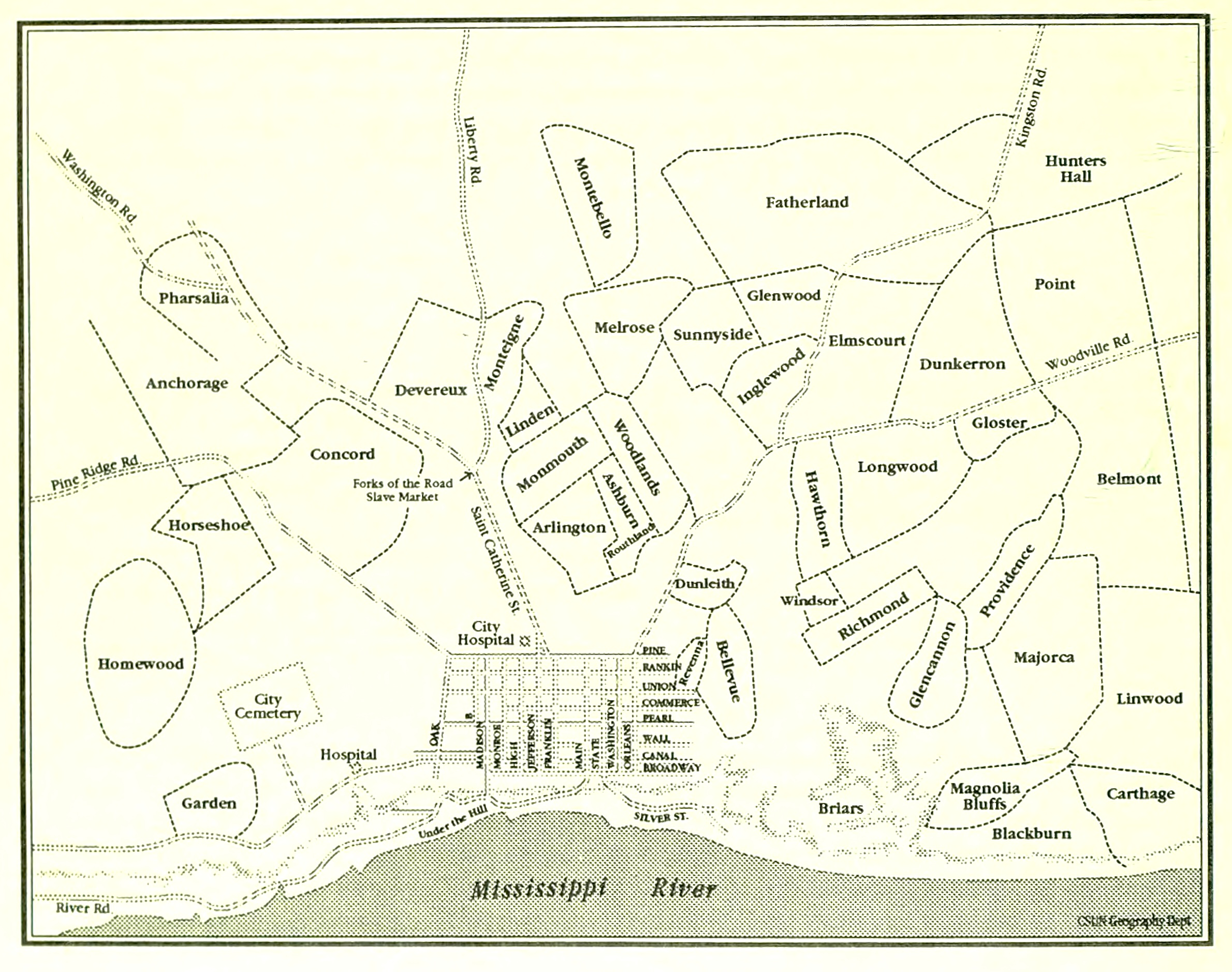
Map showing location of Melrose

As of 1840, McMurran had 14 enslaved servants in his Natchez household. McMurran commissioned the mansion Melrose around 1841, with construction completed around 1845. The family moved into the buildings permanently in 1849. In March 1850, he and Stephen Duncan both spoke at a "rally for the Union" in Adams County. In November 1851 he was a delegate from Adams County to a statewide convention "to consider the then existing relations between the government of the United States and the government and people of Mississippi, (with reference to the institution of slavery,)...assembled at the Representatives Hall in the capitol..." According to the U.S. National Park Service, which owns and operates Melrose today, "By the mid-1850s, John T. McMurran owned or held interest in five plantations, which included over 9,600 acres (3,900 ha) of land and 325 slaves." Per historian Gross, "By the 1850s, McMurran owned four plantations in Mississippi, Louisiana, and Arkansas, and together with his law partner James Carson owned hundreds of slaves and thousands of acres in Adams County alone. From his humble beginnings as a migrant with only his legal apprenticeship to recommend him, McMurran had become a wealthy planter and major slaveholder." At the time of the 1860 census, there were 21 enslaved people attached to his property in Adams County, Mississippi.

The McMurrans sold the 80-acre property in 1865 in the wake of the American Civil War. Melrose is now a part of the Natchez National Historical Park. McMurran as a prosperous former Confederate was required to apply for a presidential pardon (amnesty) after the war and did so.

== Death and legacy ==
John T. McMurran died from injuries consequent to the burning of the steamboat Fashion near New Orleans in 1866. The ship caught fire above Baton Rouge at 3 a.m. on the night of December 27, 1866, resulting in 43 fatalities. A New Orleans newspaper reported that "in jumping down from tier of cotton bales, when making his escape, was unfortunate as to break one of his legs. Thus disabled he was brought to this city, and his injuries proved so serious that he expired on the 30th ult." An obituary published in the Natchez Courier in 1867 stated, "The old bar, one by one, are passing away. At the head were Quitman and McMurran, then Montgomery & Boyd, Buckner & Stewart, Hewett &Carson, Gaines & Addison, Thatcher & Freeman, Eustis & Chaplin, Howell & Johnson, Rawlings & Armat, Vannerson & Baker, Dubuisson & Van Hosen, Sanders & Price, and others, no doubt, that I do not now recollect. The venerable Judge Vannerson, of Monticello, had removed from Natchez about the time I came to the bar. He still lives in green old age, the Nestor of the Mississippi Bar, and still engaged in active practice." The Adams County bar association passed a resolution "on occasion of the death of their late eminent associate, John T. McMurran: Resolved, that Hon. Josiah Winchester, Jas. Carson, Josephus Hewett, Judge R. Ballock, Judge J. S. B. Thacher and Gen. Wm. T. Martin be appointed a committee to draft resolutions expressive of our appreciation of Mr. McMurran's character and sincere sorrow at his untimely death, and report the same to the next term of our Circuit Court."

The artist Matthew Harris Jouett painted portraits of several of McMurran's family members.

== Personal life ==
In 1831, he married Mary Louisa Turner, a daughter of Mississippi judge Edward Turner. They ultimately had three children together, two of whom survived to adulthood.

- Mary Elizabeth McMurran (1831–1833)
- John T. McMurran Jr. (1833)
- Mary Louise McMurran m. Farar Benjamin Conner, a grandson of territorial legislator William Conner.

== See also ==
- Natchez nabobs

== Sources ==
- Ann Beha Associates (1996). Melrose Estate, Natchez National Historical Park, Natchez Mississippi (Report). Historic Structures Report, Vol. 1. Boston, Massachusetts: U.S. National Park Service, Gulf Coast System Support Office. OCLC 1553097968 – via HathiTrust.
- Gross, Ariela (2011). Local Matters: Race, Crime, and Justice in the Nineteenth-century South. Athens: University of Georgia Press. ISBN 9780820342054.
- James, D. Clayton (1993) [1968]. Antebellum Natchez. Baton Rouge, Louisiana: Louisiana State University Press. ISBN 978-0-8071-1860-3. LCCN 68028496. OCLC 28281641.
- Lynch, J. D. (1881). The Bench and Bar of Mississippi. New York: E.J. Hale & Son. LCCN 09015735. OCLC 4838263.
