= List of shipwrecks in December 1866 =

The list of shipwrecks in December 1866 includes ships sunk, foundered, grounded, or otherwise lost during December 1866.

== 1 December ==
List of shipwrecks: 1 December 1866
Ship	State	Description
Alpha	United Kingdom	The smack was wrecked on a rock off Boulmer, Northumberland. Her crew were rescued.
Betsey Williams	United Kingdom	The barque was driven ashore and sank at Redcar, Yorkshire. Her eleven crew were rescued. She was on a voyage from Vyborg, Grand Duchy of Finland to West Hartlepool, County Durham. Betsey Williams was refloated on 4 December with the assistance of four tugs and taken in to West Hartlepool, County Durham in a waterlogged condition.
Caroline and Elizabeth	United Kingdom	The barque was driven ashore and wrecked at Whitburn, County Durham. Thirteen crew were rescued by the Whitburn Lifeboat. She was later refloated and towed in to Sunderland, County Durham.
Caphemis	United Kingdom	The brig ran aground on the Kentish Knock. She was on a voyage from Boulogne, Pas-de-Calais, France to Stockton-on-Tees, County Durham. She was refloated and taken in to Ramsgate, Kent in a leaky condition.
Catherine	United Kingdom	The ship was driven ashore at Mola di Bari, Italy. She was on a voyage from Newcastle upon Tyne, Northumberland to Venice, Italy.
Columbia	United Kingdom	The schooner was severely damaged by fire at Kiel, Prussia.
Hendrik	Sweden	The brig was driven ashore on Ven. She was on a voyage from Newcastle upon Tyne, Northumberland to Stockholm. She was refloated on 3 December and taken in to Helsingør, Denmark.
Kate Dyer	United States	Bound from Callao, Peru, to New York City with a cargo of guano, the 1,275-ton ship-rigged sailing vessel sank with the loss of 13 lives in the North Atlantic Ocean off Fire Island Lighthouse on Fire Island off the south coast of Long Island, New York, immediately after colliding with the screw steamer Scotland (United Kingdom). Scotland rescued her 14 survivors. Both Kate Dyer and her cargo were a total loss.
Lincelles	United Kingdom	The ship ran aground on the Saugor Flat, in the Hooghly River.
Scotland	United Kingdom	Illustration "Wreck of the Steamship 'Scotland,' Bound for Liverpool, Off Sandy Hook," Harper's Weekly, 29 December 1866. While trying to return to New York City during a voyage carrying passengers and cargo from New York City to Liverpool, England, after suffering damage in a collision earlier in the day with the sailing vessel Kate Dyer (United States), the 3,695-ton iron-hulled screw steamer was beached in a sinking condition in 22 feet (7 m) of water on a shoal off Atlantic Highlands, New Jersey. All on board — including 14 survivors from Katie Dyer — survived. Scotland broke up during a storm before she could be salvaged and became a total loss except for some fittings stripped from her. Deemed a hazard to navigation, her wreck was demolished with dynamite two years later.
Thetis	United Kingdom	The ship was driven ashore at Ballantrae, Ayrshire. She was on a voyage from Carmarthen to Ayr.

== 2 December ==
List of shipwrecks: 2 December 1866
Ship	State	Description
James Smith	United Kingdom	The ship was driven ashore near "Estasio", Spain. She was on a voyage from Marseille, Bouches-du-Rhône, France to Hull, Yorkshire. She was refloated on 9 December.
Mewah	United Kingdom	The ship was wrecked on the Latham Shoal, 70 nautical miles (130 km) off Zanzibar. She was on a voyage from Zanzibar to London.
Thyra	Sweden	The ship was abandoned in the North Sea off Flamborough Head, Yorkshire, United Kingdom. Her crew were rescued.
Warlock	United Kingdom	The barque was driven ashore at Villa Nueva, Spain.
Unnamed	Flag unknown	The steamship was driven ashore at Sandown, Isle of Wight.

== 3 December ==
List of shipwrecks: 3 December 1866
Ship	State	Description
Cobrero	United Kingdom	The ship was wrecked on the Bird Rock, Barbados with the loss of all hands. She was on a voyage from St. Jago de Cuba, Cuba to Swansea, Glamorgan.
Jane	United Kingdom	The schooner was abandoned off Dungarvan, County Waterford. Her crew were rescued by HMRC Eliza ( Board of Customs). Jane was on a voyage from Newport, Monmouthshire to Courtmacsherry, County Cork. She came ashore and was wrecked at Tramore, County Waterford the next day.
Leo	United Kingdom	The fishing smack foundered off the coast of Norfolk with the loss of all hands.
Luinen	Flag unknown	The ship was driven ashore. She was on a voyage from Rostock to Leith, Lothian, United Kingdom. She was refloated and take in to Fraserburgh, Aberdeenshire, United Kingdom in a leaky condition.
Maria	United Kingdom	The schooner was driven ashore at Kandestederne, Skagen, Denmark. She was on a voyage from Königsberg, Prussia to Leith. She had become a wreck by 12 December. The wreck was refloated on 18 June 1867 and taken in to Fredrikshavn, Denmark.
Porthcawl	United Kingdom	The tug caught fire at Port Talbot, Glamorgan and was scuttled. She was severely damaged.
Streatham Castle	United Kingdom	The brig collided with the brig Karl (Norway) and was abandoned. Her crew survived. She came ashore on Skagen, Denmark. Streatham Castle had been refloated and taken in to Kristiansand, Norway in a derelict condition byros 6 December.
Swansea	United Kingdom	The steamship ran aground in the River Avon at Hotwells, Gloucestershire. She was on a voyage from Liverpool, Lancashire to Bristol, Gloucestershire. She was refloated the next day and take in to Bristol.
Wanderer	United Kingdom	The ship was driven ashore in Loch Indaal.

== 4 December ==
List of shipwrecks: 4 December 1866
Ship	State	Description
Amelivre	France	The schooner was wrecked on Scroby Sands, Norfolk, United Kingdom with the loss of her captain. She was on a voyage from Hull, Yorkshire to Nantes, Loire-Inférieure.
Cintra	United Kingdom	The steamship ran aground at Porto, Portugal. She was on a voyage from Porto to Liverpool, Lancashire. She was refloated and put back to Porto.
Mary Jane, and No. 4	United Kingdom	The hopper barge No. 4 was run into by the paddle steamer Mary Jane and sank in the Clyde upstream of Port Glasgow, Renfrewshire. Her crew were rescued by Mary Jane, which was beached. Mary Jane was on a voyage from Ardrishaig, Argyllshire to Port Glasgow.
Middleton	United Kingdom	The brig was driven ashore and wrecked at Jobourg, Manche, France with the loss of two of her seven crew. She was on a voyage from Jersey, Channel Islands to Sunderland, County Durham.
Onward	United Kingdom	The ship ran aground on the West Rocks, in the North Sea off the coast of Essex. She was on a voyage from Wivenhoe, Essex to South Shields, County Durham. She was refloated and assisted in to Harwich, Essex.
HSwMS Orädd	Royal Swedish Navy	The corvette was driven ashore and wrecked at Jury's Gap, Sussex, United Kingdom with the loss of twelve of the 134 people on board. Survivors were rescued by the Coastguard using rocket apparatus. She was on a voyage from Havre de Grâce, Seine-Inférieure, France to Gothenburg.
Solferino	France	The barque collided with Nadir (France) and sank in the Loire.
Swanee	United States	The ship foundered off Cape Hatteras, North Carolina. all on board were rescued. She was on a voyage from New York to Brazos, Texas.
Telegram	United Kingdom	The barque ran aground and was wrecked at Visby, Sweden. She was on a voyage from Kappelshamn, Sweden to Newcastle upon Tyne, Northumberland.
Ville de Pontorson	France	The ship was driven ashore and wrecked at Mont-Saint-Michel, Manche. Her crew were rescued. She was on a voyage from Sunderland to Granville, Manche.

== 5 December ==
List of shipwrecks: 5 December 1866
Ship	State	Description
Bride of Hesse	United Kingdom	The ship departed from Saint John's, Newfoundland, British North America for London. No further trace, presumed foundered with the loss of all hands.
Cella	United Kingdom	The ship was driven ashore on Long Island, New York, United States. She was on a voyage from London to New York City.
Emma	United Kingdom	The schooner was driven ashore at Littlehampton, Sussex, United Kingdom. Her three crew were rescued by the Littlehampton Lifeboat. She was on a voyage from Cádiz, Spain to Dunkirk, Nord, France.
Gulnare	United Kingdom	The schooner was wrecked in the Pentland Firth with the loss of a crew member. She was on a voyage from Liverpool, Lancashire to Aberdeen.
Jane Elizabeth	United Kingdom	The schooner was blown out to sea crewless from Holyhead, Anglesey. She was discovered in Morecambe Bay the next day and was towed in to Liverpool.
Jane and Mary	United Kingdom	The schooner was driven ashore and wrecked at Corry, Isle of Skye, Outer Hebrides. Her crew were rescued.
Memel	United Kingdom	The ship was run down and sunk. Her crew survived. She was on a voyage from Cardiff, Glamorgan to Barcelona, Spain.
United Service	United Kingdom	The steamship was sighted off Copenhagen, Denmark whilst on a voyage from Swinemünde, Prussia to Hull, Yorkshire. No further trace, presumed foundered with the loss of all hands.
Wallace	(United Kingdom of Great Britain and Ireland) New Zealand	The schooner was lost after it struck a reef of Chaslands Mistake in the Catlins. The crew were rescued by the schooner Edward and Christopher, laden with 466 tons of coal, was wrecked on Farewell Spit, New Zealand. All hands were saved but the cargo was lost.

== 6 December ==
List of shipwrecks: 6 December 1866
Ship	State	Description
Ann	United Kingdom	The smack was driven ashore and wrecked in Whitesands Bay. Her crew were rescued.
Barlow	United Kingdom	The barque was driven ashore on Reedy Island, Delaware, United States. She was on a voyage from Liverpool, Lancashire to Philadelphia, Pennsylvania, United States.
Charlemagne	United Kingdom	The ship was destroyed by fire at Calcutta, India.
Dove	(United Kingdom of Great Britain and Ireland) Jamaica	The sloop was wrecked on a reef off Falmouth. She was on a voyage from Kingston to Jamaica.
Elizabeth	United Kingdom	The ship was driven ashore. She was on a voyage from Poole, Dorset to "Lee". She was refloated and taken in to Deal, Kent.
Favourite	United Kingdom	The sloop was driven ashore at Carrickfergus, County Antrim.
Henry and Catherine	United Kingdom	The schooner was driven ashore and wrecked at Porth Neigwl, Caernarfonshire with the loss of all but one of her crew. She was on a voyage from Dublin to Portmadoc, Caernarfonshire.
Inga	Norway	The barque was abandoned off Fleetwood, Lancashire. All thirteen people on board were rescued by the Fleetwood Lifeboat. She was on a voyage from Miramichi, New Brunswick, British North America to Fleetwood.
Intrepid	United Kingdom	The schooner was driven ashore at Aberdeen. Her crew were rescued. She was on a voyage from Liverpool, Lancashire to Aberdeen. She was later refloated and taken in to Aberdeen.
Jane and Elizabeth	United Kingdom	The schooner was blown out to sea crewless from Amlwch, Anglesey.
Lilian	United Kingdom	The ship ran aground at Carlingford, County Louth. She was on a voyage from Saint John, New Brunswick to Liverpool. She was refloated the next day.
Rival	(United Kingdom of Great Britain and Ireland) Guernsey	The brigantine ran aground on the Oaze Sand, in the North Sea off the coast of Essex. She floated off and sank. Her crew were rescued.
Unnamed	United Kingdom	The schooner was driven ashore and wrecked at Porth Neigwl Pembrokeshire with the loss of all hands.

== 7 December ==
List of shipwrecks: 7 December 1866
Ship	State	Description
Annandale	United Kingdom	The brig ran aground on the Trinity Sand, in the North Sea off the coast of Lincolnshire. She was on a voyage from Sunderland, County Durham to London. She was refloated with the assistance of two tugs and towed in to Grimsby, Lincolnshire.
Brahmin	United Kingdom	The ship ran aground on the Patch Sand, in the North Sea off the coast of Norfolk.
Catherine and Mary	United Kingdom	The ship collided with the steamship Falcon (United Kingdom) and sank in the Firth of Clyde. She was on a voyage from Barrow in Furness, Lancashire to Greenock, Renfrewshire. She was refloated on 15 December and beached in the Bay of Quick.
Cymro	United Kingdom	The smack was abandoned in Llandudno Bay. Both crew were rescued by the Ormes Head Lifeboat.
Elbe	United Kingdom	The schooner foundered off the mouth of the Urr Water. Her crew were rescued.
Harriet and Jane	United Kingdom	The schooner was driven ashore at Seascale, Cumberland with the loss of two of her five crew. Survivors were rescued by rocket apparatus. She was on a voyage from Liverpool, Lancashire to Newry, County Antrim.
Hutton	United Kingdom	The brig sprang a leak and foundered in the North Sea off Whitby, Yorkshire. Her six crew survived. She was on a voyage from Middlesbrough, Yorkshire to London.
Jane	United Kingdom	The schooner was driven ashore and wrecked north of Whitehaven, Cumberland. Her crew were rescued. She was on a voyage from Larne, County Antrim to Whitehaven.
John Botcherby	United Kingdom	The brig sprang a leak and foundered 30 nautical miles (56 km) off Huntcliffe Foot, Yorkshire with the loss of two of her eight crew. Survivors were rescued by Durango ( (Denmark) Duchy of Schleswig). John Botcherby was on a voyage from South Shields, County Durham to London.
Juga	Norway	The barque was abandoned off Fleetwood, Lancashire, United Kingdom. Her crew were rescued by the Fleetwood Lifeboat.
Margaret and Ann	United Kingdom	The schooner was driven ashore at Seascale, Cumberland with the loss of three of her five crew. Survivors were rescued by the Coast Guard using rocket apparatus.
Margaret and Jane	United Kingdom	The brig foundered in the North Sea 30 nautical miles (56 km) off Whitby with the loss of all hands.
Margaret Davie	United Kingdom	The ship was driven ashore and wrecked at Cairnryan, Wigtownshire. She was on a voyage from Girvan, Ayrshire to Belfast, County Antrim.
Mary Ann	United Kingdom	The schooner ran aground on the Trinity Sand, in the North Sea off the coast of Lincolnshire. Her crew were rescued.
Mayflower	United Kingdom	The smack was driven ashore at the Point of Ayr, Cheshire. She floated off and sank near Mostyn, Flintshire. She was on a voyage from Queensferry, Flintshire to Bangor.
Mistress of the Seas	United Kingdom	The ship ran aground on the Pluckington Bank, in Liverpool Bay. She was on a voyage from Liverpool, Lancashire to Melbourne, Victoria. She was refloated and taken in to Birkenhead, Cheshire.
Neilson	United Kingdom	The schooner foundered off Whitby with the loss of all hands.
Nelson	United Kingdom	The brig ran aground on the Trinity Sand and was wrecked. Her crew were rescued. She was on a voyage from Hartlepool, County Durham to Shoreham-by-Sea, Sussex. Nelson was refloated on 20 December and taken in to Grimsby.
Osborne	United Kingdom	The schooner was abandoned in the North Sea off St. Abbs Head, Berwickshire. Her crew survived. Osbourne was on a voyage from Sunderland to Dundee, Forfarshire. She came ashore at Scremerston, Northumberland and was wrecked.
Port	United Kingdom	The brigantine ran aground in Manxman's Lake, Kirkcudbrightshire. She was on a voyage from Maryport, Cumberland to Bangor.
Plutus	Denmark	The ship was abandoned 3 nautical miles (5.6 km) off Skagen. Her crew were rescued by Sonnabend ( Stettin). Plutus was on a voyage from Horsens to Hull, Yorkshire.
Reindeer	United Kingdom	The brig ran aground on the Trinity Sands. She was refloated and towed in to Grimsby, Lincolnshire.
Rising Sun	United Kingdom	The brigantine ran aground on the Trinity Sand and was wrecked. Her crew were rescued.
Unity	United Kingdom	The schooner was driven ashore and wrecked north of Whitehaven. Her crew were rescued. She was on a voyage from Liverpool to Workington, Cumberland.
William	United Kingdom	The schooner collided with Caroline (United Kingdom) and sank at Lowestoft, Suffolk. Her crew were rescued by Caroline. William was on a voyage from South Shields to Lowestoft.
Witch of the Sand, or Witch of the Wave	United Kingdom	The smack was driven ashore and wrecked at Saltfleet, Lincolnshire.

== 8 December ==
List of shipwrecks: 8 December 1866
Ship	State	Description
Agnes	United Kingdom	The sloop was driven ashore and wrecked near Johnshaven, Aberdeenshire. Her crew were rescued. She was on a voyage from Fraserburgh, Aberdeenshire to Bo'ness, Lothian.
Ellen	(United Kingdom of Great Britain and Ireland) New Zealand	The cutter, heavy with a cargo of flour bound for Hokitika became stranded on the bar at Sumner, and broke up. All hands were saved.
George Pyman	United Kingdom	The steamship ran into the quayside at Antwerp, Belgium and sank at the bows.
Hermann	Prussia	The ship was driven ashore at Swinemünde. She was on a voyage from Sunderland, County Durham, United Kingdom. She was refloated on 10 December with the assistance of two tugs and taken in to Swinemunde.
Louis de Geer	Sweden	The ship departed from Kungälv for Rochester, Kent, United Kingdom. No further trace, presumed foundered with the loss of all hands.
Mayflower	United Kingdom	The ship was driven ashore at the Point of Ayr, Cheshire. She was refloated but consequently sank off Mostyn, Flintshire. Her crew were rescued.
Milo	United Kingdom	The brig collided with the steamship Gallicia (United Kingdom) and sank off Orfordness, Suffolk. Her crew were rescued by Gallicia. Milo was on a voyage from South Shields, County Durham to Rochester, Kent.
Nuevo Corriere	Flag unknown	The ship departed from Odesa, Russia for a British port. No further trace, presumed foundered with the loss of all hands.
Protector	United Kingdom	The ship departed from Havana, Cuba for Liverpool, Lancashire. No further trace, presumed foundered with the loss of all hands.
Souverain	France	The ship ran aground at the mouth of the River Mersey and was wrecked with the loss of all on board.
Wrecker	United Kingdom	The steamship was wrecked on the North Gar Sand, in the North Sea off the mouth of the River Tees. Her crew were rescued. She was on a voyage from Middlesbrough, Yorkshire to South Shields, County Durham.

== 9 December ==
List of shipwrecks: 9 December 1866
Ship	State	Description
Admiral Cator	United Kingdom	The steamship ran aground on a rock in the Sound of Jura. She was on a voyage from Hartlepool, County Durham to Glasgow, Renfrewshire.
Baobab	France	The schooner ran aground on the Gunfleet Sand, in the North Sea off the coast of Suffolk, United Kingdom. She was refloated with the assistance of a number of smacks and assisted in to Harwich, Essex, United Kingdom.
Cameronian	United Kingdom	The ship was driven ashore near the Rammekins Castle, Vlissingen, Zeeland. She was on a voyage from Liverpool, Lancashire to Antwerp, Belgium.
Clio	United Kingdom	The steamship was driven ashore and wrecked at Lemvig, Denmark. Her crew were rescued. She was on a voyage from London to Danzig.
Iberis	France	The schooner ran aground on the Barnard Sand, in the North Sea off the coast of Suffolk. Her crew survived. She was on a voyage from Sunderland, County Durham, United Kingdom to Bordeaux, Gironde.
Kate Evelyn	United Kingdom	The ship foundered off Sagres Point, Portugal. Her crew were rescued. She was on a voyage from Pomaron, Portugal to London.
Ladoga	United Kingdom	The steamship ran aground and was wrecked 20 nautical miles (37 km) south west of Holmen, Denmark. Her crew were rescued. She was on a voyage from London to Riga, Russia.
Three Brothers	United Kingdom	The schooner was wrecked on the Barnard Sand, in the North Sea off the coast of Suffolk with the loss of one of her five crew. Survivors were rescued by the Kessingland Lifeboat. She was on a voyage from Brixham, Devon to Middlesbrough, Yorkshire.

== 10 December ==
List of shipwrecks: 10 December 1866
Ship	State	Description
Artemas	United Kingdom	The schooner ran aground on the East Knock Sand, in the Thames Estuary.
Baron Osy	Belgium	The paddle steamer ran aground in the Scheldt near Vlissingen, Zeeland, Netherlands. She was on a voyage from London, United Kingdom to Antwerp.
Concordia	United Kingdom	The ship ran aground at North Shields, County Durham. She was on a voyage from Quebec City, Province of Canada, British North America to North Shields. She was refloated and taken in to North Shields.
Cornish Lass	United Kingdom	The ship was wrecked on Andros, Greece with the loss of three lives. She was on a voyage from Smyrna, Ottoman Empire to London.
Esperance	Denmark	The ship was driven ashore at Lemvig, Norway with the loss of a crew member. She was on a voyage from Odense to Hull, Yorkshire, United Kingdom.
Granville	United Kingdom	The schooner struck The Platters and consequently sank near Holyhead, Anglesey. Her crew were rescued by the tug Iron King (United Kingdom). Granville was on a voyage from Liverpool, Lancashire to Barmouth, Merionethshire.
Guisachan	United Kingdom	The ship departed from a port in British Honduras for a British port. No further trace, presumed foundered with the loss of all hands.
Harlingen	United Kingdom	The ship was run down and sunk by the steamship Kubis (United Kingdom). Harlingen was on a voyage from London to Poole, Dorset.
Henry	United Kingdom	The schooner was driven ashore on "Pelie Island". She was on a voyage from Rouen, Seine-Inférieure to Llanelly, Glamorgan. She was refloated with the assistance of a tug and towed in to Cherbourg, Seine-Inférieure for repairs.
Marvil	United Kingdom	The brigantine was wrecked in Ballydonagan Bay, 8 nautical miles (15 km) form Castletown, Isle of Man.
Mary Ann	United Kingdom	The ship foundered off Cape Clear Island, County Cork. Her crew were rescued. She was on a voyage from Liverpool, Lancashire to Trinidad and/or Cuba.
Mavina	United Kingdom	The ship was abandoned in the Irish Sea. Her crew were rescued. She was on a voyage from Glasson Dock to Liverpool, Lancashire.
Minerva	Norway	The ship foundered in the North Sea. Her crew were rescued. She was on a voyage from Sunderland to Drammen.
Norfolk	United Kingdom	The barque was wrecked on the Patrix Rocks, on the coast of Uruguay. Her crew were rescued. She was on a voyage from Cardiff, Glamorgan to Montevideo, Uruguay.

== 11 December ==
List of shipwrecks: 11 December 1866
Ship	State	Description
Brothers	United Kingdom	The smack sank in Balycastle Bay. Her crew were rescued by the Ballycastle Lifeboat. She was on a voyage from Glasgow, Renfrewshire to Belfast, County Antrim.
Diligence	United Kingdom	The ship ran aground on the Smithie Sand, in the North Sea off the coast of Yorkshire. She was on a voyage from Sunderland, County Durham to Saint-Valery-sur-Somme, Somme, France. She was refloated and towed in to Bridlington, Yorkshire in a severely leaky condition.
Dresden	Stettin	The steamship ran aground at Stettin. She was on a voyage from Leith, Lothian, United Kingdom to Stettin. She was refloated with assistance on 21 December.
George	United Kingdom	The brig was driven ashore and wrecked at Withernsea, Yorkshire. Her six crew were rescued by the Withernsea Lifeboat. She was on a voyage from South Shields, County Durham to Lowestoft, Suffolk.
Georgiana	United Kingdom	The schooner was driven ashore in Bull Bay, Anglesey. She was refloated the next day.
Golden Sunset	United Kingdom	The ship was wrecked on Derby Island with the loss of a crew member. She was on a voyage from Newcastle, New South Wales to San Francisco, California, United States.
Indus	(United Kingdom of Great Britain and Ireland) British North America	The full-rigged ship ran aground on the Long Bank, in the Irish Sea off the coast of County Wexford and sank. All twenty people on board were rescued. She was on a voyage from Liverpool, Lancashire to Philadelphia, Pennsylvania, United States.
Kezia	United Kingdom	The ship ran aground on the Smithie Sand. She was on a voyage from Blyth, Northumberland to Boulogne, Pas-de-Calais, France. She was refloated and towed in to Bridlington in a severely leaky condition.
Vigilantia	Sweden	The galiot ran aground off Hunsbykill, Denmark. She was on a voyage from Söderköping to Rochester, Kent, United Kingdom.

== 12 December ==
List of shipwrecks: 12 December 1866
Ship	State	Description
Bee	Stettin	The steamship foundered between Hirtshals and Skagen, Denmark. She was on a voyage from Stettin to Leith, Lothian, United Kingdom.
Conquest	United Kingdom	The brigantine collided with the brig Crown Prince of Prussia (Prussia) and sank off the Galloper Sand, in the North Sea off the coast of Norfolk. Her crew were rescued by Crown Prince of Prussia.
Dora	United Kingdom	The ship was wrecked on Sheep Island, Pembrokeshire. She was on a voyage from Newquay, Cornwall to Runcorn, Cheshire.
Goliah	United Kingdom	The tug ran aground near Culross, Fife. She was on a voyage from Kennetpans, Clackmannanshire to Leith.
Idalia	United Kingdom	The ship was wrecked near Bodenwinkel, Prussia. She was on a voyage from Danzig to London.
Louisa	United Kingdom	The sloop ran aground on the Newcombe Sand, in the North Sea off the coast of Suffolk. She was on a voyage from Rochester, Kent to Newcastle upon Tyne, Northumberland. She was refloated and taken in to Lowestoft, Suffolk in a leaky condition.
Margaretha	Denmark	The schooner ran aground on the Trinity Sand, in the North Sea off the coast of Lincolnshire, United Kingdom. She was on a voyage from Denmark to Hull, Yorkshire, United Kingdom.
Ocean Queen	United Kingdom	The brig sprang a leak and capsized in the Baltic Sea 45 nautical miles (83 km) west north west of Memel, Kingdom of Prussia with the loss of two of her eight crew. Four of the survivors died in the next nine days before she came ashore at Nidden, Prussia.. Ocean Queen was on a voyage from Riga, Russia to Hartlepool, County Durham.
White Star	United Kingdom	The barque was driven ashore at Killiness Point, Mull of Galloway, Wigtownshire. She was on a voyage from Maryport, Cumberland to Londonderry. Salvage was abandoned on 24 December.
William and Mary	United Kingdom	The fishing lugger was wrcecked on the Barnard Sand, in te North Sea off the coast of Suffolk with the loss of seven of her eleven crew. Survivors were rescued by a yawl and the Kessingland Lifeboat.

== 13 December ==
List of shipwrecks: 13 December 1866
Ship	State	Description
Gazelle	United Kingdom	The schooner was driven ashore and wrecked at Cap Gris-Nez, Pas-de-Calais, France. Her crew were rescued. She was on a voyage from Plymouth, Devon to London.
Marlborough	United Kingdom	The brigantine foundered off Berehaven, County Cork. Her crew were rescued. She was on a voyage from Cardiff, Glamorgan to Galway.
Margaret	United Kingdom	The ship was wrecked on the West Hoyle Sandbank, in Liverpool Bay. Her crew were rescued by the Point of Ayr Lifeboat. She was on a voyage from Barrow-in-Furness, Lancashire to Saltney, Cheshire.
Marianne	United Kingdom	The ship was driven ashore at "Ara". She was on a voyage from "Hobro" to Stockton-on-Tees, County Durham. She had become a wreck by 16 December.
Mary Ann	United Kingdom	The fishing lugger was wrecked on the Barnard Sand, in the North Sea off the coast of Suffolk with the loss of nine of her eleven crew. Survivors were rescued by a yawl and the Kessingland Lifeboat.
Mary Anna	United Kingdom	The brig foundered off Baltimore, County Cork. She was on a voyage from Saint John, New Brunswick, British North America to Cuba.
HMS Tamar	Royal Navy	The troopship ran aground off Haulbowline, County Cork. She was refloated on 17 December.

== 14 December ==
List of shipwrecks: 14 December 1866
Ship	State	Description
Catherine	United Kingdom	The brig ran aground on the Corton Sand, in the North Sea off the coast of Suffolk. She was on a voyage from Sunderland, County Durham to Southampton, Hampshire. She was refloated and assisted in to Lowestoft, Suffolk in a severely leaky condition.
Constantia	Sweden	The barque was abandoned in the Atlantic Ocean. All fifteen people on board were rescued by Electra ( (United Kingdom of Great Britain and Ireland) British North America. Constantia was on a voyage from Glasgow, Renfrewshire, United Kingdom to Saint John, New Brunswick, British North America.
Erisis	United Kingdom	The ship sank in the River Thames. She was refloated the next day and taken in to Blackwall, Middlesex.
Marion	United Kingdom	The ship was driven ashore near Girvan, Ayrshire. She was on a voyage from Ayr to Liverpool, Lancashire.
Metropolis	United Kingdom	The ship was wrecked on the Rocas Atoll, Brazil. Her crew were rescued. She was on a voyage from Cardiff, Glamorgan to Rio de Janeiro, Brazil.
Orontes	Royal Navy	The troopship was driven ashore at Cork.
Palmen	United Kingdom	The brig collided with the barque London (United Kingdom) and was abandoned in the Atlantic Ocean. The barque Nanna (Norway) rescued the master and eight crew from Palman.
Teresa	Prussia	The galiot collided with a steamship and sank in the River Thames at Blackwall, Middlesex, United Kingdom.

== 15 December ==
List of shipwrecks: 15 December 1866
Ship	State	Description
Amelia	France	The schooner was wrecked on the Haisborough Sands, in the North Sea off the coast of Norfolk, United Kingdom. Her crew were rescued. She was on a voyage from Blyth, Northumberland, United Kingdom to Caen, Calvados.
Edwin Daniel	United Kingdom	The ship was driven ashore at Bayfield, New Brunswick, British North America. She was on a voyage from Charlottetown, Prince Edward Island to Liverpool, Lancashire.
Lavinia	United Kingdom	The ship was driven ashore and wrecked near "Killia" before 29 December with the loss of nine of the eleven people on board.
Marie	United Kingdom	The ship was driven ashore at Höganäs, Sweden. She was on a voyage from Newport, Monmouthshire to Gävle, Sweden. She was refloated and taken in to Helsingborg, Sweden.

== 16 December ==
List of shipwrecks: 16 December 1866
Ship	State	Description
Alma	United Kingdom	The ship foundered 35 nautical miles (65 km) south east of the Gut of Canso. She was on a voyage from Belfast, County Antrim to New York, United States.
Eliza	(United Kingdom of Great Britain and Ireland) South Australia	The ship was wrecked at Port Fairy, Victoria.

== 17 December ==
List of shipwrecks: 17 December 1866
Ship	State	Description
Fort William	United Kingdom	The full-rigged ship foundered in the Atlantic Ocean. Her crew were rescued by the brig L. W. Armstrong (United States). Fort William was on a voyage from Demerara, British Guiana to Liverpool, Lancashire.
Gloria Deo	Hamburg	The ship ran aground on Stensnæs, Denmark. She was on a voyage from Odense, Denmark to King's Lynn, Norfolk, United Kingdom.
Lewes	United Kingdom	The ship was wrecked on the Haisborough Sands, in the North Sea off the coast of Norfolk. She floated off and sank. Her crew took to a boat; they were rescued by the steamship Edith (Netherlands. Lewes was on a voyage from Pomaron, Portugal to Hull, Yorkshire.
Ouse	United Kingdom	The steamship ran aground in the Oder near Zegerort. She was on a voyage from Stettin to Hull, Yorkshire.
Undine	United Kingdom	The barque capsized at Baltimore, Maryland, United States in a squall.
Venus	United Kingdom	The ship was wrecked between "Gilang" and "Batoetali". Nine people were rescued. She was on a voyage from Batavia, Netherlands East Indies to Auckland, New Zealand.

== 18 December ==
List of shipwrecks: 18 December 1866
Ship	State	Description
Accommodation	United Kingdom	The sloop ran aground in the Lynn Deeps. She was on a voyage from London to King's Lynn, Norfolk. She was refloated the next day and taken in to King's Lynn in a leaky condition.
Carry	(United Kingdom of Great Britain and Ireland) British North America	The ship was wrecked at Cranberry Isles, Maine, United States.
Catherine	United Kingdom	The ship ran aground at Helmsdale, Sutherland. She was on a voyage from Meikle Ferry, Sutherland to Helmsdale.
Epervier	France	The ship ran aground on the Longsand, in the North Sea off the coast of Essex, United Kingdom. She was on a voyage from Middlesbrough, Yorkshire, United Kingdom to Nantes, Loire-Inférieure. Epervier was refloated the next day and assisted in to Harwich, Essex in a leaky condition.
Grimsby	United Kingdom	The steamship was driven ashore at Brunsbüttel, Prussia. She was on a voyage from Grimsby, Lincolnshire to Hamburg. She was refloated with assistance from the steamships Hercules and Magnet (both Hamburg) and taken in to Hamburg.
Renown	United Kingdom	The ship was wrecked on the Paternosters, in the Baltic Sea. Her crew were rescued. She was on a voyage from Cardiff, Glamorgan to Uddevalla, Sweden.

== 19 December ==
List of shipwrecks: 19 December 1866
Ship	State	Description
Contender	United Kingdom	The schooner was driven ashore east of Rye, Sussex. She was on a voyage from Hartlepool, County Durham to Rye. She was refloated and towed in to Rye.
Jubilee	United Kingdom	The brig was driven ashore and wrecked at Scituate, Massachusetts. She was on a voyage from Newfoundland, British North America to Boston, Massachusetts, United States.
Koningin Elizabeth Louise	Danzig	The ship was driven ashore at Dragør, Denmark. She was on a voyage from Danzig to Liverpool, Lancashire, United Kingdom. She was refloated on 22 December and taken in to Copenhagen, Denmark.
Laura	United Kingdom	The ship sank at Cromarty.
Martha Hendrika	Hamburg	The ship was driven ashore. She was on a voyage from Hamburg to Bahia, Brazil. She was refloated and taken in to Delfzijl, Groningen, Netherlands.
Prince Consort	United Kingdom	The ship was wrecked at Timaru, New Zealand.
Velocity	United Kingdom	The steamship collided with the barque Mary (United Kingdom) and sank in the River Thames downstream of Gravesend, Kent with the loss of one live. She was on a voyage from Calais, France to London.

== 20 December ==
List of shipwrecks: 20 December 1866
Ship	State	Description
Barbadian	United Kingdom	The ship was destroyed by fire 6 nautical miles (11 km) west of Pwllheli, Caernarfonshire with the loss of three of her crew.
Clarendon	(United Kingdom of Great Britain and Ireland) New Zealand	The 16-ton schooner was wrecked when it ran into an unexpected gale at Moeraki while en route from Port Chalmers to Oamaru. She was driven on shore and was inundated by the surf.
Volunteer	(United Kingdom of Great Britain and Ireland) New Zealand	The cutter was wrecked on the bar at the mouth of the Fox River, with the loss of one life.

== 21 December ==
List of shipwrecks: 21 December 1866
Ship	State	Description
Attila	United Kingdom	The ship departed from Viana do Castelo, Portugal for Saint John's, Newfoundland, British North America. No further trace, presumed foundered with the loss of all hands.
Constance	Norway	The barque was driven ashore and wrecked on Vendicari Islet, Italy with the loss of all but two of her crew.
Mary Ann	United Kingdom	The ship was wrecked on Maggers Bank, in the Bahamas. She was on a voyage from New Orleans, Louisiana to Havre de Grâce, Seine-Inférieure, France.
Victor	Russia	The brig was driven ashore at "Nahrs". She was on a voyage from Libava, Courland Governorate to London, United Kingdom.

== 22 December ==
List of shipwrecks: 22 December 1866
Ship	State	Description
Crescent	(United Kingdom of Great Britain and Ireland) British North America	The ship was driven ashore at Donna Nook, Lincolnshire. She was on a voyage from Quebec City, Province of Canada to Hull, Yorkshire. She was later refloated and completed her voyage.
Luck's All	United Kingdom	The ship ran aground off Berwick upon Tweed, Northumberland. She was on a voyage from Kingbarns, Fife to South Shields, County Durham.
Ocean Bride	United Kingdom	The crewless ship was driven ashore at Schwarzort, Prussia.
Petrel	United Kingdom	The ship was abandoned in the Baltic Sea. She was on a voyage from Gävle, Sweden to London. She was subsequently driven ashore and wrecked at Schwarzort.
Ramonja	Spain	The ship departed from Havana, Cuba for Falmouth, Cornwall, United Kingdom. No further trace, presumed foundered with the loss of all hands.

== 23 December ==
List of shipwrecks: 23 December 1866
Ship	State	Description
Best Bower	United Kingdom	The steamship ran aground on the Wester Till, in the Elbe. She was on a voyage from Leith, Lothian to Hamburg. She was abandoned as a total loss the next day.
Hetton, and Uhlenhorst	United Kingdom; Hamburg	The steamship Hetton collided with the steamship Uhlenhorst and sank off the mouth of the Humber. She was on a voyage from Sunderland to London. Uhlenhorst was on a voyage from Antwerp to North Shields, Northumberland. She was severely damaged and was taken in to Wallsend, Northumberland for repairs.
Scotia	United Kingdom	The ship was wrecked in the Pentland Firth. Her five crew were rescued. She was on a voyage from Liverpool to Arbroath, Forfarshire.

== 24 December ==
List of shipwrecks: 24 December 1866
Ship	State	Description
A. C. Garden	United States	The barque was wrecked on the North East Reef, in the Turks Islands. Her crew were rescued. She was on a voyage from New York to Aspinwall, United States of Colombia.
C. C. van Horn	(United Kingdom of Great Britain and Ireland) British North America	The ship foundered off Point Rip. She was on a voyage from Cienfuegos, Cuba to Boston, Massachusetts, United States.
Harrier	United Kingdom	The ship departed from Lundy Island, Devon for São Miguel Island, Azores. No further trace, presumed foundered with the loss of all hands.
Pioneer	(United Kingdom of Great Britain and Ireland) New Zealand	The steamer was wrecked at the Manukau Heads when she parted her moorings during a heavy swell.
Sea Foam	United Kingdom	The ship ran aground on the Arklow Bank, in the Irish Sea off the coast of County Wicklow. She was on a voyage from Liverpool, Lancashire to Curaçao. She was refloated on 2 Januar 1867 and put back to Liverpool in a leaky condition.
Water Lily	United Kingdom	The ship ran aground at Liverpool and was damaged. She was on a voyage from Taganrog, Russia to Liverpool. She was refloated and taken in to Liverpool.

== 25 December ==
List of shipwrecks: 25 December 1866
Ship	State	Description
Cambodia	Flag unknown	The 811-ton barque was wrecked on the bar at the mouth of New Zealand's Manukau Harbour. She was en route from Bombay to Howland Island and was attempting to put into the harbour for provisions, but the captain mistook a smaller channel for the main entrance channel.
Ellen	(United Kingdom of Great Britain and Ireland) British North America	The brig collided with the barque Vikingen (Norway) and was abandoned. Her crew were rescued. She was on a voyage from South Shields, County Durham to Guadeloupe.
Factor	United Kingdom	The barque struck rocks and sank in the Carlingford Lough. Her crew survived. She was on a voyage from Maryport, Cumberland to Newry, County Antrim.

== 26 December ==
List of shipwrecks: 26 December 1866
Ship	State	Description
Black Diamond	United Kingdom	The steamship departed from Belfast, County Antrim for Troon, Ayrshire. No further trace, presumed foundered with the loss of all hands.
Eleanor and Thomas	United Kingdom	The schooner was driven ashore in the River Severn. She was on a voyage from Londonderry to Gloucester.
Five Sisters	United Kingdom	The brig was driven ashore in the River Usk. She was on a voyage from Hartlepool, County Durham to Newport, Monmouthshire. She was refloated in February 1867 and taken in to Newport for repairs.
Rosebud	United Kingdom	The brigantine was wrecked on the Gunfleet Sand, in the North Sea off the coast of Essex. Her crew were rescued. She was on a voyage from Seaham, County Durham to London.
Titus Mortinsen	Denmark	The ship ran aground on the Skaegn Reef. She was on a voyage from Assens to London.

== 27 December ==
List of shipwrecks: 27 December 1866
Ship	State	Description
Commodore	United States	The 984-gross register ton sidewheel paddle steamer was beached at Horton's Point on the north coast of Long Island at Southold, New York, to prevent her from sinking during a storm. All on board survived, but she was wrecked.
Edwin and Eva	United Kingdom	The ship was driven ashore near "Canal Cove", Prince Edward Island, British North America.
Enchantress	United Kingdom	The ship foundered in the English Channel. Her crew were rescued. She was on a voyage from Odesa, Russia to Falmouth, Cornwall.
Fashion	United States	The steamboat was destroyed by fire in the Mississippi River at Vicksburg, Mississippi with the loss of 43 lives.
Frith Jol	Norway	The schooner was taken in to Tanager in a derelict condition. She was on a voyage from Newcastle upon Tyne, Northumberland, United Kingdom to Svelvik.
Harriet Wild	(United Kingdom of Great Britain and Ireland) Isle of Man	The brigantine collided with the steamship Balbec (France) and sank at New Ferry, Cheshire. Her crew were rescued. She was on a voyage from Cardiff, Glamorgan to Liverpool, Lancashire.
Hoffnung	Stettin	The ship was abandoned off Grimstad, Norway. She was on a voyage from Stettin to Sunderland, County Durham, United Kingdom.
Mountain Maid	United Kingdom	The ship foundered off Montrose, Forfarshire. Her five crew were rescued. She was on a voyage from Aberdeen to Leith, Lothian.
Odin	Hamburg	The brig foundered in the Atlantic Ocean. Her crew were rescued by a Portuguese schooner. She was on a voyage from Rio de Janeiro, Brazil to London, United Kingdom.
Prince Consort	(United Kingdom of Great Britain and Ireland) New Zealand	The 35-ton schooner was wrecked at Timaru. She was hit broadside by a heavy sea which shifted her ballast causing her to heel over.
Seaman	United Kingdom	The ship ran aground at Egremont, Lancashire. She was on a voyage from Saint George, New Brunswick, British North America to Liverpool.
Thistle	United Kingdom	The ship was driven ashore at Troon, Ayrshire. She was on a voyage from London to Greenock, Renfrewshire. She was later refloated and taken in to Greenock.
Titus	United Kingdom	The ship was driven ashore on Skagen, Denmark. She was on a voyage from Assens, Denmark to London.

== 28 December ==
List of shipwrecks: 28 December 1866
Ship	State	Description
Active	United Kingdom	The schooner was wrecked on the Cross Sand, in the North Sea off the coast of Norfolk. Her crew were rescued. She was on a voyage from Port Gordon, Moray to London.
Emily B. Souder	United States	The steamship was wrecked on the Rattlesnake Shoals. All on board were rescued. She was on a voyage from Charleston, South Carolina to New York.
George and Lucy	Russia	The snow stranded on a reef off Domesnes, Courland Governorate, Russia. She was on a voyage from Riga, Russia to Hull, Yorkshire.
Honduras	United Kingdom	The ship was abandoned in the Atlantic Ocean. Her crew were rescued by Abby Eyersop (United States). Honduras was on a voyage from Demerara, British Guiana to London.
Horta	United States	The ship was wrecked on Nashawena Island, Massachusetts with the loss of seven of her nine crew.
Kelpie	United Kingdom	The brig ran aground on the Barber Sand, in the North Sea off the coast of Norfolk. She was refloated and assisted in to Great Yarmouth, Norfolk in a severely leaky condition by a tug and the Caister Lifeboat Birmingham No. 2 ( Royal National Lifeboat Institution).
Magellan	United States	The schooner was wrecked off Sandy Hook, New Jersey.
Margaretha	United Kingdom	The ship was driven ashore at Great Yarmouth, Norfolk. She was on a voyage from Bordeaux, Gironde, France to Goole, Yorkshire.
Parks	United States	The schooner capsized in Chesapeake Bay with the loss of five lives.
Salander	United States	The steamship was wrecked on the coast of Georgia with the loss of all but four of her crew.
Sea Breeze	United States	The schooner was wrecked off Sandy Hook.
Seagull	United Kingdom	The ship was driven ashore at Ayr. She was on a voyage from Loch Fyne to Belfast, County Antrim.
Sylph	United States	The barque was driven ashore and wrecked on Nashawena Island with the loss of all hands. She was on a voyage from Baltimore, Maryland to Boston, Massachusetts.
U. B. F. Thompson	United States	The schooner was wrecked off Sandy Hook.
Union	United Kingdom	The ship departed from Hartlepool, County Durham for Southampton, Hampshire. No further trace, presumed foundered with the loss of all hands.

== 29 December ==
List of shipwrecks: 29 December 1866
Ship	State	Description
Boliva	United Kingdom	The ship was wrecked at "Balabok", Ceylon. Her crew were rescued.
Frère et Sœur	France	The schooner collided with the barque Marathon (United Kingdom) and sank. Her crew were rescued by Marathon. Frère et Sœur was on a voyage from Caen, Calvados to Brest, Finistère.
Nautilus	United Kingdom	The steamship was sighted off Skagen, Denmark whilst on a voyage from Danzig to Hull, Yorkshire. No further trace, presumed foundered with the loss of all hands.
Newton Colville	United Kingdom	The steamship was sighted off Skagen whilst on a voyage from Danzig to London. No further trace, presumed foundered with the loss of all hands.
W. B. Thompson	United States	Carrying a cargo of railroad wheels, the schooner sank off Sandy Hook, New Jersey.
Wye	United Kingdom	The steamship was sighted off Skagen whilst on a voyage from Danzig to Dublin. No further trace, presumed foundered with the loss of all hands.

== 30 December ==
List of shipwrecks: 30 December 1866
Ship	State	Description
Agricola	United Kingdom	The brig was driven ashore at Aberdeen. She was refloated on 7 January 1867 and taken in to Aberdeen.
Brenda	United Kingdom	The brig ran aground at Hartlepool, County Durham. She was on a voyage from London to Sunderland, County Durham.
Edwin Daniel	United Kingdom	The ship was driven ashore in the River Liffey.
Eva	United Kingdom	The coble was abandoned off Whitby, Yorkshire. Her crew were rescued by the Whitby Lifeboat.
Hector	United Kingdom	The coble was abandoned off Whitby. Her crew were rescued by the Whitby Lifeboat.
Lasborough	United Kingdom	The steamship ran aground at Messina, Sicily, Italy. She was on a voyage from Newcastle upon Tyne to Catania, Italy.
Linda	United Kingdom	The barque ran aground on Salthholm, Denmark. She was refloated.
Mary Jane	France	The tug sprang a leak and foundered in the North Sea. Her crew were rescued by Edissa ( (United Kingdom of Great Britain and Ireland) Guernsey). Mary Jane was on a voyage from Newcastle upon Tyne, Northumberland, United Kingdom to Bordeaux, Gironde.
Mathilde Julie	France	The lugger ran aground on the Du Four Reefs. She was on a voyage from Brest, Finistère to Nantes, Loire-Inférieure. She was refloated and put in to Le Croisic, Finistère in a leaky condition.
Mercury	United Kingdom	The schooner was driven ashore and wrecked at Aberdeen with the loss of one of her six crew.
Nelson	United Kingdom	The ship ran aground on the Trinity Sand off the mouth of the Humber. She was on a voyage from Grimsby, Lincolnshire to Seaham, County Durham. She was refloated and resumed her voyage, but put in to Hartlepool in a leaky condition.

== 31 December ==
List of shipwrecks: 31 December 1866
Ship	State	Description
Alexander	United Kingdom	The ship was driven ashore and wrecked at Great Yarmouth, Norfolk. She was on a voyage from London to Newcastle upon Tyne, Northumberland.
Andrae	United Kingdom	The schooner sank off the Mull of Galloway, Wigtownshire. Her crew were rescued. She was on a voyage from Maryport, Cumberland to Belfast, County Antrim.
Charlotte	Sweden	The ship was driven ashore at Flamborough Head, Yorkshire. United Kingdom with the loss of three of her seven crew. She was on a voyage from Gothenburg to Sunderland, County Durham, United Kingdom. She broke up the next day.
Flora	United Kingdom	The brigantine sank at Ramsey, Isle of Man. She was on a voyage from Garston, Lancashire to Dundalk, County Louth.
Lion	United Kingdom	The schooner was driven ashore at Whitby, Yorkshire. Her five crew were rescued by the Whitby Lifeboat. She was on a voyage from London to Sunderland. She was refloated on 5 January 1867 and taken in to Whitby for repairs.
Maria	Sweden	The ship was driven ashore and wrecked near Staithes, Yorkshire. Her nine crew were rescued by rocket apparatus. She was on a voyage from Danzig to Newcastle upon Tyne.
Monitor	United Kingdom	The ship was wrecked on the coast of Travancore.
Zampa	United Kingdom	The ship was wrecked at Ceará, Brazil.

== Unknown date ==
List of shipwrecks: Unknown date in December 1866
Ship	State	Description
Ada G. York	United States	The ship was driven ashore on Cape Sable Island, Nova Scotia, British North America before 3 December. She was on a voyage from New Orleans, Louisiana to Liverpool, Lancashire, United Kingdom.
Adelaide	United Kingdom	The ship foundered in Bideford Bay. She was on a voyage from Newport, Monmouthshire to Plymouth, Devon.
Adeline	United Kingdom	The ship was driven ashore at Cape Lookout, North Carolina, United States. She was on a voyage from Wilmington, Delaware to Liverpool. She was consequently condemned.
Alix	France	The ship was driven ashore on the Île de Ré, Finistère. She was on a voyage from Swansea, Glamorgan, United Kingdom to Bordeaux, Gironde.
Annie Whitburn	United Kingdom	The ship struck rocks at Cape Vilano, Spain and was wrecked. Her crew survived. She was on a voyage from Cardiff, Glamorgan to Cartagena, Spain.
Annie Armstrong	United Kingdom	The ship was abandoned in the Atlantic Ocean. Her crew were rescued by Patriot (United Kingdom).
Ariadne	United Kingdom	The ship was driven ashore in the Falkland Islands. She was on a voyage from the Chincha Islands, Peru to Queenstown, County Cork. She was refloated.
Bismack	United Kingdom	The ship was driven ashore at Cape Porcupine, Labrador, British North America before 17 December. She was on a voyage from Shediac, Nova Scotia, British North America to Liverpool.
Carl	Stralsund	The ship was driven ashore at "Kallebod". She was on a voyage from Stralsund to Leith, Lothian, United Kingdom.
Celia	United Kingdom	The steamship was driven ashore on Long Island, New York, United States before 6 December. She was on a voyage from London to New York City.
Chard	United Kingdom	The ship was abandoned. She was on a voyage from Sydney, Nova Scotia, British North America to Bridgeport, Connecticut, United States.
Christian	Sweden	The ship was driven ashore at Fredrikshavn, Denmark.
Courier	United Kingdom	The ship was driven ashore. She was on a voyage from Athens, Greece to an Englisn port.
Cythia	United Kingdom	The ship was wrecked on Grand Cayman before 23 December. Her crew were rescued. She was on a voyage from Liverpool to the Brazos River, Mexico.
Dalhousie	(British Raj) Bombay and Bengal Marine	The ship struck the wreck of Die Vernon (United Kingdom) and was damaged. She was taken in to Alibag, India in a waterlogged condition.
Dora	United Kingdom	The ship was wrecked on "Barnbourn". She was on a voyage from Maryport, Cumberland to Belfast, County Antrim.
Duce	United Kingdom	The ship was lost on a voyage from the Danube to a British port.
Eclipse	(United Kingdom of Great Britain and Ireland) New Zealand	The schooner was wrecked at the mouth of the Buller River in early December.
Edwin Fox	United Kingdom	The ship was driven ashore on the Indian coast. She was on a voyage from London to Bombay. She was refloated and taken in to Calicut.
Eliza	Hamburg	The ship was abandoned in the North Sea before 10 December. Her crew were rescued.
Evangelist	United Kingdom	The ship was reported to have sunk off Cape Matapan, Greece before 21 December. She was on a voyage from Taganrog, Russia to Falmouth, Cornwall. Also reported to have come ashore at Mylopotamos, Greece where she was wrecked.
Excelsior	United Kingdom	The barque was wrecked at the mouth of the Scheldt. She was on a voyage from Taganrog to Antwerp, Belgium.
Fairy	(United Kingdom of Great Britain and Ireland) Jersey	The ship ran aground on the Pennington Spit, off the Isle of Wight. She was on a voyage from Glasgow, Renfrewshire to Southampton, Hampshire.
Flink	Sweden	The brig was driven ashore in the Great Belt. She was refloated and put in to Kallundborg, Denmark, where she arrived on 3 December.
Freya	Norway	The ship ran aground off Gallipoli, Ottoman Empire. She was on a voyage from Odesa, Russia to a Norwegian port.
Frithiof	Norway	The schooner was abandoned in the North Sea between 7 and 13 December. She was on a voyage from the River Tyne to Drammen.
Gebroeders	Netherlands	The ship was driven ashore at Wijk aan Zee, North Holland, Netherlands. She was on a voyage from Batavia, Netherlands East Indies to Amsterdam, North Holland.
General McLellan	United States	The ship was driven ashore on Long Island. She was on a voyage from Antwerp, Belgium to New York. She had been refloated by 21 December.
Gloria des Ordense	Flag unknown	The ship was driven ashore before 17 December.
Guadiana	United Kingdom	The brig was lost near Great Yarmouth, Norfolk with the loss of all but one of her ten crew. She was on a voyage from Saint Petersburg, Russia to London. Wreckage from the ship was up on Amrum, Friesland, Netherlands between 25 and 31 December.
Helen	(United Kingdom of Great Britain and Ireland) British North America	The ship was abandoned in the North Sea before 26 December. She was on a voyage from Newcastle upon Tyne, Northumberland for Guadeloupe. She was discovered by the steamship Adele, which put five crew on board with the intention of taking her in to Great Yarmouth.
Huron	United States	The ship was driven ashore on Long Island, New York before 22 December. She was on a voyage from Cárdenas, Cuba to New York City.
Isabella	(United Kingdom of Great Britain and Ireland) New Zealand	The schooner went ashore on rocks at the mouth of the Fox River, severely holing her hull.
Isabella	United Kingdom	The ship ran aground on a reef 6 nautical miles (11 km) off Point Retereo Grande, Brazil before 10 December.
Java	United Kingdom	The ship was wrecked on Ossabaw Island, Maine, United States before 28 December. She was on a voyage from Liverpool to Savannah, Georgia, United States.
Jettina	Flag unknown	The ship was wrecked on "Lobus Island". She was on a voyage from Buenos Aires, Argentina to Santa Catarina.
J. M. Morales	United Kingdom	The barque ran aground on the Indian Rocks before 3 December. She was on a voyage from Shediac, Nova Scotia to the Clyde. She was refloated and taken in to Pictou, Nova Scotia for repairs.
Magna Charta	United Kingdom	The ship was driven ashore on Skagen, Denmark. She was refloated and towed in to Fredrikshavn, Denmark in a leaky condition.
Marengo	United Kingdom	The barque ran aground on the Haisborough Sands, in the North Sea off the coast of Norfolk. She was on a voyage from Sunderland, County Durham to Barbados. She was refloated and taken in to London, where she arrived on 5 December in a leaky condition.
Margaret and Jane	United Kingdom	The barque was driven ashore at Whitburn, County Durham. Eight crew were rescued by the Whitburn Lifeboat.
Maria Henry	United Kingdom	The ship was wrecked off the Isla of Pines, Cuba.
Millman	United Kingdom	The ship was wrecked on the Niding Reef, in the Baltic Sea. Her crew were rescued. She was on a voyage from Riga, Russia to Grangemouth, Stirlingshire.
Milner	United Kingdom	The ship was wrecked on Gotland, Sweden. Her seven crew survived.
Notra Dame de Rama	Flag unknown	The ship sank in the Atlantic Ocean.
Petchora	Trieste	The ship was driven ashore at Egmond aan Zee, North Holland. She was on a voyage from Newcastle upon Tyne, Northumberland, United Kingdom to Trieste.
Princess Clotilde	France	The schooner was driven ashore on the coast of Sardinia, Italy.
Protector	United Kingdom	The ship was abandoned in the North Sea before 10 December. She was on a voyage from Ventava, Courland Governorate to London. She came ashore at Lemvig, Denmark on 12 December in a capsized condition.
Quarry Maid	United Kingdom	The ship foundered off Flamborough Head, east Riding of Yorkshire.
Quindaro	United States	The ship was driven ashore at Union, New Jersey. She was on a voyage from Nuevitas, Cuba to New York. She was refloated.
Remedio	Austrian Empire	The barque was driven ashore near Cephalonia, Greece.
Robert Noble	(United Kingdom of Great Britain and Ireland) British North America	The ship caught fire and was beached on Prince Edward Island.
Sir Colin Campbell	United Kingdom	The brig collided with Petrel (United Kingdom) and sank in the English Channel off Portland, Dorset. Her crew were rescued by Petrel. Sir Colin Campbell was on a voyage from Middlesbrough, Yorkshire to Poole, Dorset.
Standard	United Kingdom	The ship was driven ashore in the Dardanelles. She was on a voyage from Odesa to a British port. She was refloated and resumed her voyage.
Tay	United Kingdom	The schooner ran aground on the Gaa Sands, at the mouth of the River Tay. Her five crew were rescued by the steamship Auld Reekie (United Kingdom) and the Broughty Ferry Lifeboat.
Tina Forbes	United Kingdom	The ship was abandoned in the Atlantic Ocean. She was on a voyage from Quebec City to the Clyde.
Ulysses	United Kingdom	The ship foundered at Rodrigues. Most of her passengers and crew were rescued by Braunstone (United Kingdom). One boat was reported missing. She was on a voyage from London to Bombay.
Volant	United States	The ship was driven ashore. She was on a voyage from Boston to Rio de Janeiro, Brazil. She was refloated and completed her voyage.
Zion	United Kingdom	The schooner was driven ashore at Whitby, Yorkshire. Her five crew were rescued by the Whitby Lifeboat.
