= Justice Hurst =

Justice Hurst may refer to:

- Cecil Hurst (1870–1963), president judge of the Permanent Court of International Justice in The Hague
- David W. Hurst (c. 1820s – 1882), justice of the Supreme Court of Mississippi

== See also ==
- David Hirst (judge) (1925–2011), English Lord Justice of Appeal
