= Melrose (Natchez, Mississippi) =

Coordinates: 31.543090°N 91.383063°W

- U.S. National Register of Historic Places
- U.S. National Historic Landmark
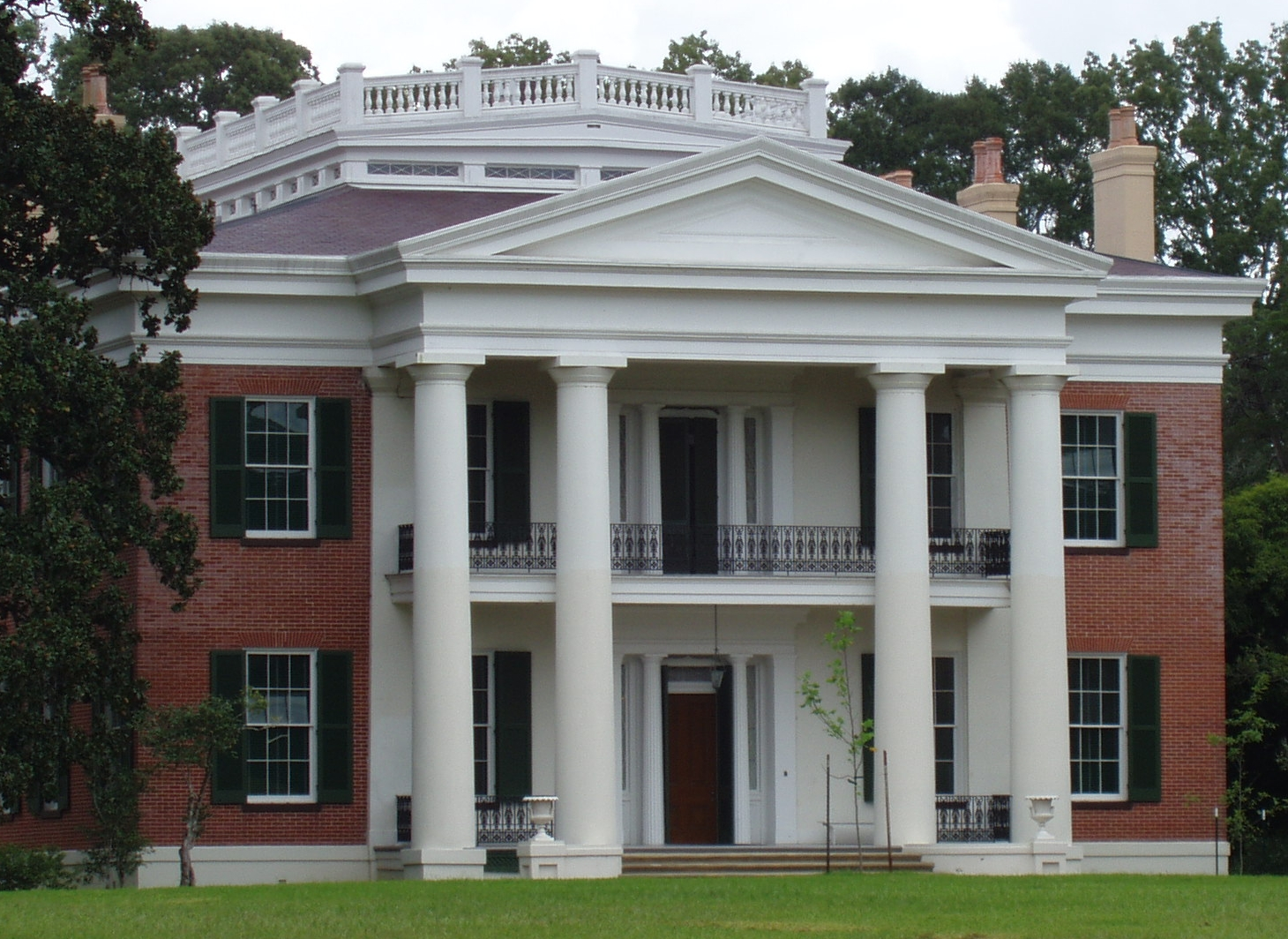
- Melrose in 2006

- Location within Mississippi Location within the United States
- Location: 1 Melrose-Montebello Parkway, Natchez, Mississippi
- Area: 15,000 square feet (1,400 m^{2})
- Built: 1848
- Architect: Jacob Byers
- Architectural style: Greek Revival
- Part of: Natchez National Historical Park (ID01000276)
- NRHP reference No.: 74002253

Significant dates
- Added to NRHP: May 30, 1974
- Designated NHL: May 30, 1974

Melrose is a 15,000-square-foot (1,400 m^{2}) mansion in Natchez, Mississippi, designed in the Greek Revival style. The 80-acre (320,000 m^{2}) estate is now part of Natchez National Historical Park and is open to the public by guided tours. The house is furnished for the period just before the Civil War. Melrose was declared a National Historic Landmark in 1974.

== History ==
John T. McMurran, a successful lawyer and planter who used the forced labor of enslaved people, had come to Natchez in 1824 or 1825 from Pennsylvania, and became a law partner of future Governor of Mississippi, John A. Quitman. McMurran married in 1831, Mary Louisa Turner, daughter of Edward Turner, a prominent Mississippi Supreme Court justice and first cousin to John Quitman's wife Eliza. After the great tornado ravaged Natchez in 1840, John McMurran began planning a grand mansion on the outskirts of town, and hired Maryland architect, Jacob Byers, to design the house the McMurrans named "Melrose," after Melrose Abbey in Scotland, that they had visited previously. Melrose is the only building that can be definitely attributed to Byers. The McMurrans spared no expense as the windows, doors, cornice moldings, stairways and floors are made out of the finest woods. In 1865, John McMurran, hurting financially due to the American Civil War, and grieving from the deaths of their daughter and two grandchildren, sold Melrose to Elizabeth Davis, the wife of attorney and planter George Malin Davis. The couple planned on moving to Maryland, but John McMurran died in a steamboat accident in 1866.

Elizabeth and George Davis purchased Melrose in 1865 as a result of Union soldiers occupying their town home, Choctaw, during the Civil War. The Davis family rarely used Melrose and it remained unoccupied for most of the next four decades. The 1883 death of George Davis as well as his daughter, Julia, as a young woman left her six-year-old son, George Malin Davis Kelly, as heir to Melrose, Choctaw and the rest of the Davis property holdings in Natchez and Louisiana. Young George was sent to New York City to be raised by his maternal grandmother. Former Davis slaves, Alice Sims and Jane Johnson, are credited with being the caretakers of Melrose during this time.

George Kelly married Ethel Moore in 1900 and the following year they returned to Natchez. They selected Melrose as their primary home and restored the home after its extended time of closure. Instead of remodeling, the couple decided to keep the house intact. Ethel Kelly also brought in furnishings from Choctaw to add to the furniture already existing at Melrose. The Kelly's resided in Melrose until 1975 when Ethel died.

John and Betty Callon purchased the property in 1976 as their personal home, and as a venue for lavish entertainment for their company, Callon Petroleum Company. The Callons retained the integrity of the house and grounds as they took preservation issues as part of their restoration process. As a result, hundreds of photographs were taken of the property and material samples were saved that are invaluable sources of information to curators today.

== Mansion and grounds ==
The interior of the first floor is arranged around a central hall and consists of a dining room, drawing room, parlor, library, back hall, storage, and service rooms. The central and back hall provide a fine example of painted floor cloth that is original to the house, and another feature is the punkah found in the dining room. Interior doorways are framed by Ionic columns and sunburst-type woodwork above. The rooms also feature plaster ceiling medallions and solid pocket doors. Bedrooms, many with original furnishings, are found on the second floor. Above, Melrose possesses an unusually large widows walk.

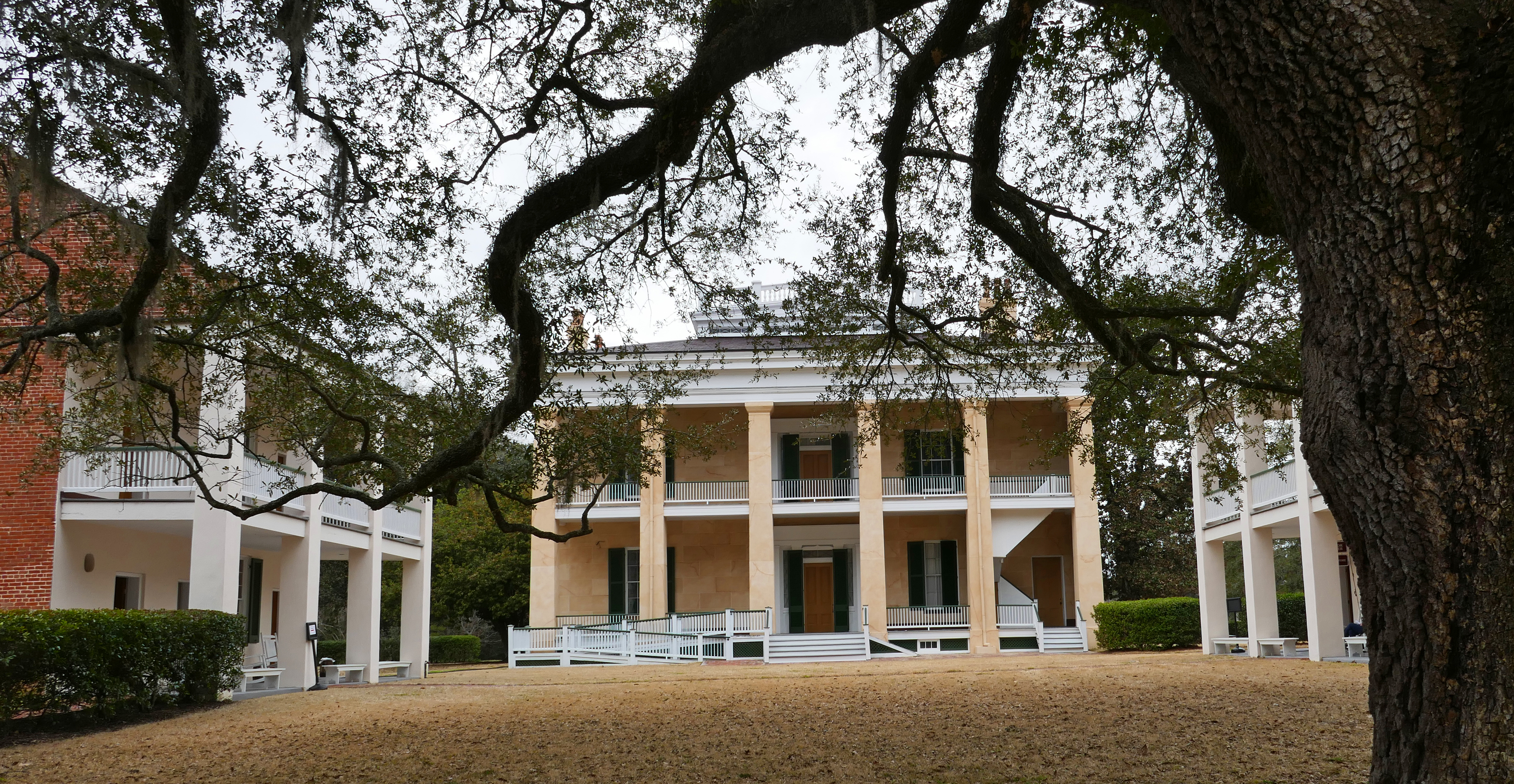
The rear of the mansion is flanked by the former dairy building (left) and the kitchen building (right).

The grounds feature outbuildings including the two storied kitchen and dairy buildings, octagonal cistern houses, a smoke house, a privy, one of the last remaining slave quarters in Natchez, a barn, and a carriage house.

== Tourism and legacy ==
As Melrose was one of the most intact antebellum estates in the South, due to the fact that the McMurrans had sold their furniture with the house and subsequent owners did the same, the National Park Service purchased the estate in 1990. Melrose along with Fort Rosalie and the William Johnson House form the Natchez National Historical Park.

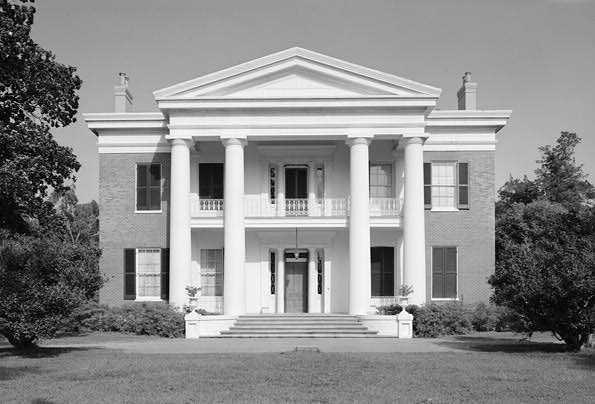
Melrose in 1975

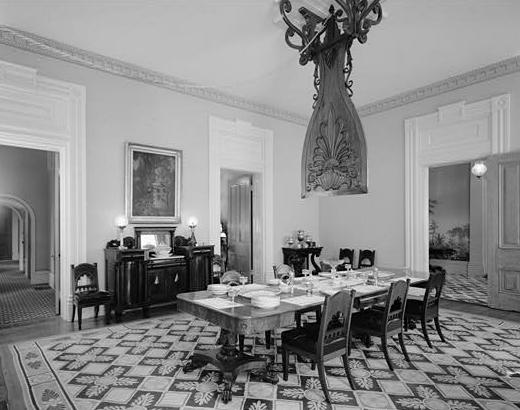
Melrose dining room

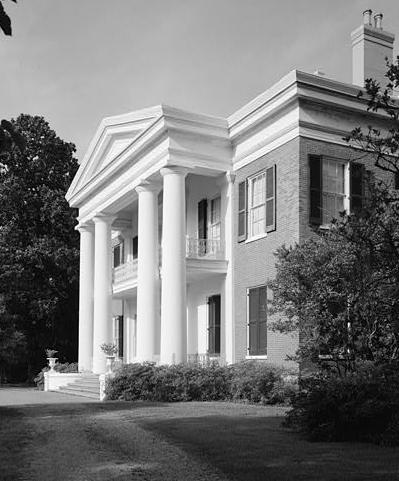
Melrose portico

== See also ==
- List of National Historic Landmarks in Mississippi
- National Register of Historic Places listings in Adams County, Mississippi

== Sources ==
- Ann Beha Associates (1996). Melrose Estate, Natchez National Historical Park, Natchez Mississippi (Report). Historic Structures Report, Vol. 1. Boston, Massachusetts: U.S. National Park Service, Gulf Coast System Support Office. OCLC 1553097968 – via HathiTrust.
