= David Hirst =

David Hirst is the name of:

- David Hirst (judge) (1925–2011), English Lord Justice of Appeal, 1992–1999
- David Hirst (journalist) (1936–2025), Middle East correspondent based in Beirut
- David Hirst (footballer) (born 1967), former football player, played for Sheffield Wednesday
- David Hirst (arachnologist), described many species of huntsman spider, South Australian Museum in Adelaide

== See also ==
- David Hurst (1926–2019), British-German actor, best known as Rudolph the headwaiter in Hello, Dolly
- David W. Hurst (c. 1820s–1882), justice of the Supreme Court of Mississippi
