= Cotesworth P. Smith =

American judge (1807–1862)

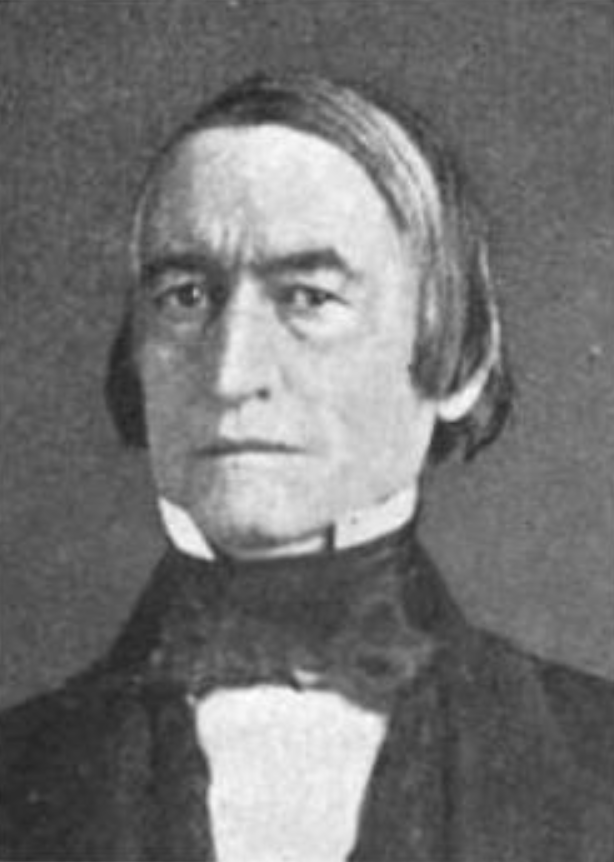
Justice Cotesworth Pinckney Smith

Cotesworth Pinckney Smith (1807 – November 11, 1862) was an associate justice of the Supreme Court of Mississippi from 1832 to 1838, and again in 1840, and was chief justice from 1849 to 1861, returning to Associate Justice status from then until his death in 1862.

== Early life, education, and career ==
A native of South Carolina, Smith came in his boyhood to the portion of the Mississippi Territory that would later become Wilkinson County, and "received a meager education, but, being endowed with fine natural talents, and possessed of much energy and ambition, turned his attention to the law and made rapid progress".

Smith, "on reaching his maturity, turned his attention to the law", and in 1826 was elected as a Whig to represent Wilkinson County in the Mississippi House of Representatives, where he served as chairman of the Committee on Internal Improvements and "performed an active and laborious part in that body". In 1830 he was elected to represent the county in the Mississippi State Senate.

== Judicial service and later life ==
In 1832, Mississippi enacted a new constitution, thereby restructuring its supreme court. The following year, Smith was elected to the court, along with William L. Sharkey and Daniel W. Wright.

Smith's term expired in 1837, and in 1840 he was appointed by Governor Alexander G. McNutt to fill the vacancy on that bench occasioned by the death of Justice Pray, but about a month later he lost his bid for election to that seat to Edward Turner. Smith then returned to the practice of law, where "with a riper experience, and with his talents invigorated by the wide scope of their exercise upon the bench, Smith stood among the most prominent of the Mississippi bar".

He was again elected to the supreme court in 1849, and in November 1851 he was made chief justice, remaining in this office until his death. He delivered the opinion of the court in the famous case of Mississippi v. Johnson, 25 Miss. R., holding that the State was liable for the payment of the bonds of the Union Bank, in contradiction to the political decision on this subject.

In July 1850, Smith was among a number of dignitaries, including Mississippi Governor John A. Quitman, indicted for "getting up an expedition against the island of Cuba, a territory belonging to a nation with which we are at peace", in violation of U.S. neutrality laws. Unlike Quitman, Smith traveled to New Orleans in November 1850, where the trial was to be held, to answer the charges in person. The trial lasted for several months, culminating in the dismissal of charges for lack of evidence in the spring of 1851.

Following Smith's death in 1862, David W. Hurst of Amite county was in October, 1863, elected to fill the unexpired term, but the courts were then closed due to the American Civil War, and Hurst's occupancy of the bench was merely nominal.

== See also ==
- List of justices of the Supreme Court of Mississippi

Political offices
Preceded by Newly established court P. Rutulius R. Pray; Joseph S. B. Thatcher	Justice of the Supreme Court of Mississippi; 1832–1838; 1840–1840; 1849–1862	Succeeded by P. Rutulius R. Pray; Edward Turner; David W. Hurst
