= William B. Griffith =

American judge (1795–1827)

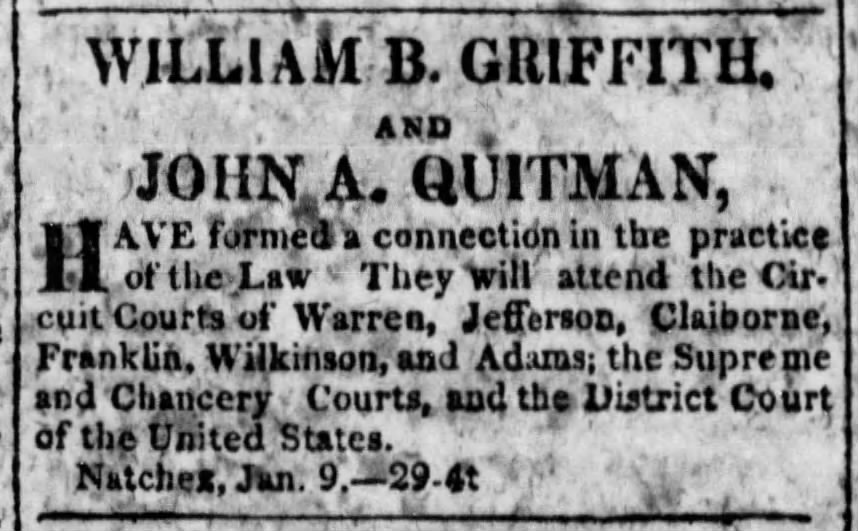
"Griffith & Quitman" Mississippi Free Trader, January 9, 1823

William B. Griffith (1795 – October 28, 1827) was a Mississippi attorney and orator who was elected by the legislature as a justice of the Supreme Court of Mississippi in February 1827. He declined the office.

== Life and career ==
He was a native of New Jersey and graduated from the College of New Jersey. He may have been resident in Natchez by 1818. In the 1820s, Griffith had a law partnership with a young John A. Quitman. Griffith was resident in Natchez first, and Quitman arrived in 1822 with a letter of introduction. Griffith was "said to have been the most polished orator that had yet appeared in Mississippi." He was appointed by President James Monroe to serve as United States Attorney for the District of Mississippi, holding this office from 1822 to 1828, when he was succeeded by Felix Huston. In February 1827, he was elected by the Mississippi state legislature as a justice of the Supreme Court of Mississippi, but Griffith declined the office. According to Dunbar Rowland, "[George Winchester] was a candidate for judge of the supreme court in February, 1827, to succeed Hampton, but the vote was 19 to 16, for William B. Griffith. When the latter declined, the governor appointed Judge Winchester."

== Personal life and death ==
He married Theodosia Turner in Natchez in 1823. She was the daughter of Mississippi judge Edward Turner, from his first marriage to Mary West, daughter of Cato West.

Griffith died in Natchez in October 1827. The cause of death was reportedly of yellow fever. John T. McMurran, a clerk at the firm, replaced Griffith as Quitman's law partner. His widow, Theodosia L. Griffith, died after a brief illness in February 1829. McMurran and Griffith were married to sisters, and Quitman was married to their cousin, a daughter of Henry Turner.
