= Louis L. Winston =

American judge (1784–1824)

Louis L. Winston (1784 – August 20, 1824) was a justice of the Supreme Court of Mississippi from 1821 until his death in 1824.

A native of Virginia, Winston was a son of U.S. Representative Joseph Winston, a brother of Mississippi politician Fountain Winston, and brother-in-law of Robert Williams, another North Carolina Representative. Winston moved to the Mississippi Territory and became a prominent lawyer. He was also a colonel in the state militia. In 1809 he was appointed the district attorney general for Madison County, Mississippi. He appears to have moved to the Natchez District in about 1817. He served as the secretary of the Constitutional Convention of 1817, and was a judge of second district and of the Mississippi Supreme Court from 1821 until his death on August 20, 1824. He was succeeded on the court by Edward Turner.

Winston died at his residence in Washington, Mississippi, after a short illness. Both Winston County, Mississippi (established 1833) and Louisville, Mississippi (chartered 1836) were named for Winston.

== See also ==
- List of justices of the Supreme Court of Mississippi

Political offices
Preceded by William Bayard Shields	Justice of the Supreme Court of Mississippi; 1821–1824	Succeeded by Edward Turner
