= United States Attorney for the District of Mississippi =

Defunct U.S. federal prosecutor's office

United States Attorney for the District of Mississippi is a defunct United States Attorney's office in Mississippi Territory and then the U.S. state of Mississippi from 1813 to 1838. The U.S. Attorney for Mississippi was the chief law enforcement officer for the United States District Court for the District of Mississippi. The district was succeeded by the United States Attorney for the Northern District of Mississippi and the United States Attorney for the Southern District of Mississippi.

== Office holders ==
- Thomas Anderson (1813–1814)
- William Crawford (1814–1818)
- Beta Metcalf (1818–1822)
- William B. Griffith (1822–1828)
- Felix Huston (1828–1830)
- George Adams (1830–1836)
- Richard M. Gaines (1836–1838)
