= 33rd Mississippi Infantry Regiment =

19th century Confederate infantry unit from Mississippi

- Active: 1862–1865
- Disbanded: April 26, 1865
- Country: Confederate States
- Allegiance: Mississippi
- Branch: Confederate States Army
- Type: Infantry
- Size: Regiment
- Battles: American Civil War: Second Battle of Corinth; Vicksburg Campaign; Atlanta Campaign; Franklin-Nashville Campaign; Carolinas Campaign

Commanders
- Notable commanders: David W. Hurst

The 33rd Mississippi Infantry Regiment was a unit of the Confederate States Army in the American Civil War. Formed in 1862, the regiment fought in numerous battles of the Western theater before surrendering in April, 1865.

== History ==
The 33rd Mississippi Infantry was organized at Grenada in April, 1862. In early 1862 another unrelated regiment led by Aaron Hardcastle had been briefly designated as the 33rd Mississippi Regiment, but this unit's number was changed to the 45th. The first major action of the regiment was the Second Battle of Corinth in October, where General John Villepigue reported: "the Thirty-third Mississippi, Colonel D. W. Hurst commanding charged the entrenchments and drove the enemy from then in gallant style." However, the Confederate attempts to recapture the heavily-fortified town of Corinth were unsuccessful, and the Southern forces withdrew after being defeated there.

In 1863 the regiment joined the Vicksburg Campaign, opposing Union attempts to take the strategic city during Steele's Bayou expedition. The 33rd later clashed with Union general Ulysses S. Grant's forces near Vicksburg, but the regiment was outside the city's defensive lines when it fell on July 4, and fought as part of General Joseph E. Johnston's forces at the state capital of Jackson later that month.

In 1864 the regiment moved to Georgia and took part in the Atlanta campaign, as Union general William T. Sherman's Union forces fought with Confederate forces in the city's vicinity. The 33rd fought at Resaca, New Hope Church, Kennesaw Mountain, and Peachtree Creek, where commanding officer Colonel Jabez L. Drake was killed, along with 158 others from the regiment killed, wounded, or captured.

During the Battle of Franklin in November, 1864, the regimental flag was captured during an unsuccessful Confederate assault on an entrenched Union position. After the Franklin-Nashville Campaign in Tennessee, the regiment only had 85 officers and soldiers fit for duty. In 1865 the 33rd was sent to take part in the Carolinas Campaign, and was consolidated with the remnants of the 1st & 22nd Mississippi Regiments, along with the 1st Mississippi Sharpshooters Battalion. This combined force surrendered on April 26, 1865, at Greensboro, North Carolina.

== Commanders ==
Commanders of the 33rd Mississippi Infantry:

- Colonel David W. Hurst
- Colonel Jabez L. Drake, killed at Peachtree Creek, 1864.
- Lieutenant Colonel William B. Johnson
- Lieutenant Colonel John Harrod

== Notable members ==
- John Tillman Lamkin, Confederate Congressman, 1864-1865.

== Organization ==
Companies of the 33rd Mississippi Infantry:

- Company A, "Cumberland Guards" of Neshoba County.
- Company B, "Amite Guards" of Amite County.
- Company C, "Johnson Guards" of Lawrence County.
- Company E, "Holmesville Guards" of Pike County
- Company H, "Rebel Avengers"
- Company I, "Mississippi Defenders" of Panola County.
- "Davis Guards"
- "Franklin Guards" of Franklin County.
- "Leake Rebels" of Leake County.

== See also ==
- List of Mississippi Civil War Confederate units
