= Edward Turner (judge) =

American judge (1778–1860)

Edward Turner (November 25, 1778 – May 23, 1860) was a state legislator and public official who served as Justice of the Supreme Court of Mississippi from 1824 to 1832, and again from 1840 to 1843.

== Early life ==
He was born in Fairfax County, Virginia, and studied at Transylvania University in Kentucky. He settled at Natchez, Mississippi, and represented Adams county in the legislature. He also held various other public offices.

He moved with his father's family to Kentucky in 1786 where he attended country schools and, at intervals, Transylvania University. In 1799 he was taken into the family of Col. George Nicholas, first law professor of the college, and this enabled him to read law while also clerking for Col. Nicholas until he died that year. Turner continued his studies under professor James Brown, assisted by his elder brother, Fielden L. Turner, who was admitted to the Mississippi bar in 1807. Edward first came down the river for the practice of law, and arrived at Natchez in January, 1802. Says Sparks: "Four brothers emigrated to the country about the same time. Two brothers remained at Natchez, one at Bayou Sara, in Louisiana, and the fourth went to New Orleans. All became distinguished: three as lawyers, who honored the bench in their respective localities, and the fourth as a merchant and planter accumulated an immense fortune."

== Career ==
Edward Turner was appointed aide-de-camp and private secretary for Governor Claiborne and clerk of the House of Representatives soon after his arrival. In August, he was appointed clerk of the court of Jefferson County, succeeding Col. John Girault.

In July, 1803, he was appointed by the president the first registrar of the land office west of Pearl River, then the most western land office in the United States. He was on duty at the town of Washington until succeeded by Thomas H. Williams, when he removed to Greenville in Jefferson County and continued the practice of law. Moving further north he had a plantation in Warren County in 1810. He was elected to the assembly in 1811 and was major of a regiment.

His wife died in February, 1811, and he married Eliza B. Baker December 1812. Returning to Natchez in 1813, he continued his law practice and was elected city magistrate and president of the board of selectmen. He was elected in 1815 to the last general assembly of the Territory, sitting in 1815 and 1816. In December 1815, he was elected by the two houses to "digest the statutes of the Mississippi Territory." This work, entitled Statutes of the Mississippi Territory etc. was the second publication of its kind in Mississippi Territory, the first having been made by Judge Toulmin in 1807. It was printed at Natchez in 1816 by Peter Isler, printer to the Territory. It appears to have been a complete, well-arranged, and satisfactory compilation of the United States laws applying to the Territory and the acts of the general assembly.

After this Turner was elected to the constitutional convention of 1817, where he was one of the committee that framed the first constitution of the State. Equally important was his work as representative of Adams county in the first legislature, 1817 to 1818. He chaired the judiciary committee and established the judicial system under the constitution. He continued a member of the legislature until 1822, being twice elected speaker. In 1820 and 1821 he served as attorney general by appointment of Governor Poindexter. In 1823 he was appointed judge of the criminal court of Adams county and in 1824 as judge of the supreme court, becoming presiding judge in 1829, a position he held until superseded under the constitution of 1832. He was chancellor of the State from 1834 to 1839 and greatly improved the chancery methods. In the 1839 Mississippi gubernatorial election, he was the Whig candidate. He received about 16,000 votes and was defeated by Alexander McNutt.

In 1840 he was elected to the High court upon the death of Justice Pray, and in 1844 he was elected to the Mississippi State Senate by Jefferson and Franklin counties. At the expiration of his term on the bench in November 1843, the bar in attendance on the high court resolved, "That the State of Mississippi is under many obligations to the Hon. Edward Turner for the many years of arduous labor he has devoted to her service, and for the distinguished example of purity, integrity and patriotism which he has afforded to her citizens." He died at Woodlands, his home near Natchez, May 23, 1860. He was survived by his wife and several children. Judge Turner was a portly and commanding figure, six feet two inches tall, and was described as generous and kind, brilliant in conversation, and gracious in manners. "He was not considered a profound lawyer," says Lynch. But he was thoroughly honest and industrious, and was the great judicial figure of the early period of the State.

== Personal life ==
He was married in September 1802 to Mary West, a daughter of Cato West. Mary West Turner died in 1811.

- Theodosia Turner m. William B. Griffith

His second wife was Mary Baker (1789–1877).

- Mary Louisa Turner m. John T. McMurran
- Edward Turner Jr.
- Fanny Turner m. Lemuel P. Conner, grandson of William Conner
- John Turner

== See also ==
- List of justices of the Supreme Court of Mississippi
- John T. McMurran, son-in-law
- William B. Griffith, son-in-law

== Sources ==
- Ann Beha Associates (1996). Melrose Estate, Natchez National Historical Park, Natchez Mississippi (Report). Historic Structures Report, Vol. 1. Boston, Massachusetts: U.S. National Park Service, Gulf Coast System Support Office. OCLC 1553097968 – via HathiTrust.
- "Edward Turner and Family Papers, Mss. 1403" (PDF). Louisiana and Lower Mississippi Valley Collections, LSU Libraries. Baton Rouge, Louisiana. 2020 [2003].

Political offices
Preceded by Louis L. Winston; Cotesworth P. Smith	Justice of the Supreme Court of Mississippi; 1824–1832; 1840–1843	Succeeded by William L. Sharkey; Joseph S. B. Thatcher
