= List of shipwrecks in August 1866 =

The list of shipwrecks in August 1866 includes ships sunk, foundered, grounded, or otherwise lost during August 1866.

== 1 August ==
List of shipwrecks: 1 August 1866
Ship	State	Description
Die Vernon	United Kingdom	The ship was wrecked on the Choal Kado Reef with the loss of three of her crew. She was on a voyage from Liverpool, Lancashire to Bombay, India.
Tubal Cain	United Kingdom	The brig ran aground on the Margate Sands and sank.

== 3 August ==
List of shipwrecks: 3 August 1866
Ship	State	Description
Petronella Johanna	Netherlands	The ship was driven ashore on "Boomjes Island", Netherlands East Indies. She was on a voyage from London, United Kingdom to Surabaya, Netherlands East Indies.
Rapid	United Kingdom	The ship ran aground and sank near Le Hourdel, Somme, France. Her crew were rescued.
Tartar	United Kingdom	The brigantine was wrecked off Inishbofin, County Donegal with the loss of two of her crew. She was on a voyage from Dunfanaghy, County Donegal to Glasgow, Renfrewshire.
No. 2	United Kingdom	The pilot cutter was driven ashore near Carnoustie, Forfarshire.

== 4 August ==
List of shipwrecks: 4 August 1866
Ship	State	Description
Bromley	United Kingdom	The barque collided with the steamship City of Aberdeen (United Kingdom) and sank.
Cardigan	United Kingdom	The ship was driven ashore at Plymouth, Devon. She was refloated and resumed her voyage.
HMS Gleaner	Royal Navy	The Gleaner-class gunboat was driven ashore on "Gonti Island". Subsequently refloated and returned to service.
Valentina	United Kingdom	The ship was abandoned in the Atlantic Ocean. Her crew were rescued. She was on a voyage from Havana, Cuba to Liverpool, Lancashire.
Ysabel	Spain	The ship was abandoned in the Atlantic Ocean. She was on a voyage from Havana to Liverpool.

== 5 August ==
List of shipwrecks: 5 August 1866
Ship	State	Description
Jane Goodyear	United Kingdom	The ship was wrecked at "Moselle", Mexico. She was on a voyage from London to Sisal, Yucatán and Campeche City, Mexico.

== 6 August ==
List of shipwrecks: 6 August 1866
Ship	State	Description
Affondatore	Regia Marina	The ironclad warship sank in a storm while in port at Ancona. She was refloated, repaired, and returned to service.
Doris	Danzig	The ship was driven ashore near "Raa", Sweden. She was on a voyage from Hartlepool, County Durham, United Kingdom to Neufahrwasser. She was refloated and put in to Helsingør, Denmark.
Jane Goodyear	United Kingdom	The ship sank at Bimini, Bahamas. She was on a voyage from London to Campeche City, Mexico.

== 7 August ==
List of shipwrecks: 7 August 1866
Ship	State	Description
Commerce	United Kingdom	The ship sprang a leak, capsized and sank in the North Sea off the coast of Lincolnshire. Her crew were rescued by Excelsior (United Kingdom). Commerce was on a voyage from Woodbridge, Suffolk to Sunderland, County Durham.

== 8 August ==
List of shipwrecks: 8 August 1866
Ship	State	Description
Albion	United Kingdom	The ship sank in the Kattegat. Her crew were rescued. She was on a voyage from Stornoway, Isle of Lewis, Outer Hebrides to Stettin.
Pallas	United Kingdom	The ship was abandoned in the Atlantic Ocean. Her crew were rescued by Stonewall Jackson (United Kingdom). Pallas was on a voyage from Liverpool, Lancashire to Halifax, Nova Scotia, British North America.

== 9 August ==
List of shipwrecks: 9 August 1866
Ship	State	Description
Cyclone	United Kingdom	The full-rigged ship was wrecked on the coast of Japan with the loss of a crew member. She was on a voyage from Sydney, New South Wales to Shanghai, China.
Lady Stewart	United Kingdom	The brig sank off Heligoland after a Bremen pilot cutter refused to take off her crew or take her in tow. Her eight crew took to a skiff; they were rescued the next day by Norsken (Sweden. Lady Stewart was on a voyage from South Shields, County Durham to Hamburg.

== 10 August ==
List of shipwrecks: 10 August 1866
Ship	State	Description
Herald	United Kingdom	The schooner sprang a leak and foundered 25 nautical miles (46 km) north east by east the Great Orme Head, Caernarfonshire. Her four crew survived. She was on a voyage from the River Duddon to Newport, Monmouthshire.
Lady Westmorland	United Kingdom	The full-rigged ship departed from Port Glasgow, Renfrewshire. No further trace, presumed foundered with the loss of all hands.
Wasp	United Kingdom	The steamship sprang a leak and sank in the River Wyre. Her passengers were rescued. She was on a voyage from Fleetwood to Southport, Lancashire. She was refloated and beached at Fleetwood.

== 11 August ==
List of shipwrecks: 11 August 1866
Ship	State	Description
Ann	United Kingdom	The ship departed from Huelva, Spain for Newcastle upon Tyne, Northumberland. No further trace, presumed foundered with the loss of all hands.
Ann and Emma	United Kingdom	The smack was wrecked near Portholland, Cornwall. Her crew were rescued. She was on a voyage from Portholland to Plymouth, Devon.
Mayflower	United Kingdom	The ship foundered in the North Sea off the coast of Yorkshire. Her crew were rescued by the sloop Nine Brothers.
President	United Kingdom	The ship sprang a leak and foundered off Strumble Head, Pembrokeshire. Her crew were rescued. She was on a voyage from Par, Cornwall to Port Ellesmere, Cheshire.
unknown flat	United States	The lumber flat broke loose from her moorings and drifted down Dog River and was destroyed by a torpedo at the mouth of Dog River in Mobile Bay, Alabama.

== 12 August ==
List of shipwrecks: 12 August 1866
Ship	State	Description
HMS Scout	Royal Navy	The Pearl-class corvette struck an uncharted rock in the Pacific Ocean. Subsequently repaired and returned to service.

== 13 August ==
List of shipwrecks: 13 August 1866
Ship	State	Description
Mary and Agnes	United Kingdom	The ship ran aground on the Longsand, in the North Sea off the coast of Essex. She was on a voyage from Sunderland, County Durham, to Le Havre, Seine-Inférieure, France. She was refloated with assistance and put in to Lowestoft, Suffolk in a leaky condition.
Jose S. Romas	Brazil	The ship was wrecked at Laguna, Santa Catarina. Her passengers were rescued. She was on a voyage from the River Plate to Laguna.

== 14 August ==
List of shipwrecks: 14 August 1866
Ship	State	Description
Blanche	United Kingdom	The steamship ran aground at Shoreham-by-Sea, Sussex. She was refloated the next day.
Venus	United Kingdom	The ship was driven ashore at Angle, Pembrokeshire. She was on a voyage from Cardiff, Glamorgan to Cork. She was refloated and beached.
Five unnamed vessels	United Kingdom	The schooners ran aground on the Burbo Bank, in Liverpool Bay.

== 15 August ==
List of shipwrecks: 15 August 1866
Ship	State	Description
Fulmar	United Kingdom	The brig ran aground on the Middle Grunden, in the Baltic Sea. She was on a voyage from Sunderland, County Durham, to Saint Petersburg, Russia. She was refloated with the assistance of a steamship and taken in to Copenhagen, Denmark.
Harriet	United Kingdom	The ship ran aground on the Dick Sand, in the North Sea off the coast of Nord and sank. Her crew were rescued.
Mary Ann	United Kingdom	The ship collided with Holland (Flag unknown) and sank in the River Thames at Limehouse, Middlesex.
Onward	United Kingdom	The barque was wrecked on Gorriti Island, Uruguay. Her crew survived.

== 16 August ==
List of shipwrecks: 16 August 1866
Ship	State	Description
Arnold	United Kingdom	The schooner was driven ashore at Redcar, Yorkshire. She was refloated and resumed her voyage.
Ilva	United Kingdom	The barque was wrecked in Algoa Bay.
Lady Napier	United Kingdom	The ship departed from North Shields, Northumberland for Danzig. No further trace, presumed foundered with the loss of all hands.
Weybourne	United Kingdom	The sloop collided with the schooner Jessie (United Kingdom) and sank in the North Sea off the coast of Norfolk. Her crew were rescued by Jessie. Weybourne was on a voyage from Sunderland, County Durham, to London.

== 17 August ==
List of shipwrecks: 17 August 1866
Ship	State	Description
Betsey	(United Kingdom of Great Britain and Ireland) British North America	The ship was wrecked on the coast of Newfoundland.
Caleb Haley	United States	The ship was wrecked on the coast of Mexico. Her crew survived.
Christina Wubbegina	Netherlands	The ship sank in the North Sea. Her crew were rescued. She was on a voyage from Sunderland, County Durham, United Kingdom to Stettin.
Mary Gillespie	United Kingdom	The brig was abandoned in the North Sea (55°06′N 3°20′E). Her eight crew were rescued by the yacht Treide Egg (Denmark). Mary Gillespie was on a voyage from the River Tyne to Constantinople, Ottoman Empire.

== 18 August ==
List of shipwrecks: 18 August 1866
Ship	State	Description
Alice	United Kingdom	The schooner collided with the steamship Douro (Portugal) and sank in Liverpool Bay off the Crosby Lightship ( Trinity House). Alice was on a voyage from Liverpool to Preston, Lancashire.
Minnie Waterson	United Kingdom	The ship foundered off Great Yarmouth, Norfolk. Her crew survived. She was on a voyage from London to Kronstadt, Russia.
Towy	United Kingdom	The smack sprang a leak and sank off Milford Haven, Pembrokeshire. Her crew were rescued. She was on a voyage from Cardiff, Glamorgan to an Irish port.
Wingate Grange	United Kingdom	The ship was damaged at Sunderland, County Durham, by two separate explosions in her cargo of coal. A crew member was severely injured in each explosion.

== 19 August ==
List of shipwrecks: 19 August 1866
Ship	State	Description
Alfred Barrett	United States	The schooner exploded, caught fire and was destroyed at Jersey City, New Jersey with the loss of at least three of her four crew.
Bruiser	United Kingdom	The steamship collided with the steam collier Haswell (United Kingdom) and sank in the North Sea off Aldeburgh, Suffolk with the loss of fifteen of the 108 people on board. Survivors were rescued by the collier and the schooner Perseverance (United Kingdom), which rescued three people. Bruiser was on a voyage from Hull, Yorkshire to London.
Hermina Hendrika	Netherlands	The galiot was run down and sunk in the North Sea 30 nautical miles (56 km) off Tynemouth, Northumberland, United Kingdom by the steamship Fairy Queen (United Kingdom). Her crew were rescued by Fairy Queen.
Lambert	Bremen	The ship caught fire, exploded and was destroyed at Jersey City.
Sardinia	United Kingdom	The ship was abandoned at sea. Her crew were rescued by Royal Family (United Kingdom). Sardinia was on a voyage from Rangoon, Burma to Liverpool, Lancashire.
Vulcan	Belgium	The ship foundered in the North Sea off the coast of Yorkshire. Her crew survived.

== 20 August ==
List of shipwrecks: 20 August 1866
Ship	State	Description
Duncan	(United Kingdom of Great Britain and Ireland) British North America	The barque foundered in the North Sea. All sixteen people on board were rescued by the schooner Edward (Belgium). Duncan was on a voyage from Gothenburg, Sweden to Boston, Massachusetts, United States.
Helen	United Kingdom	The collier was driven ashore and wrecked at Brouwershaven, Zeeland, Netherlands. She was on a voyage from North Shields, Northumberland to Rotterdam, South Holland, Netherlands.
Theodore	United States	The steamship was destroyed by fire. All on board were rescued. She was on a voyage from Boston, Massachusetts, to Charleston, South Carolina.
Woodman	United Kingdom	The schooner was driven ashore at Berwick upon Tweed, Northumberland. She was on a voyage from Liverpool, Lancashire to Eyemouth, Berwickshire. She was refloated the next day and taken into Berwick upon Tweed.

== 21 August ==
List of shipwrecks: 21 August 1866
Ship	State	Description
Hibernia	(United Kingdom of Great Britain and Ireland) Isle of Man	The cutter ran ashore and was wrecked at the Point of Ayre. Her crew were rescued. She was on a voyage from Ramsey to Troon, Ayrshire.
Omar Pacha	United Kingdom	The ship was driven ashore at Krasnaya Gorka, Russia. She was on a voyage from Sunderland, County Durham, to Kronstadt, Russia. She was refloated with the assistance of a tug and taken into Kronstadt.

== 22 August ==
List of shipwrecks: 22 August 1866
Ship	State	Description
United Kingdom, and No. 6	United Kingdom	The dredger No. 6 was run into and sunk in the Clyde by the steamship Heron (United Kingdom), which was trying to avoid the steamship United Kingdom, which had run aground.

== 23 August ==
List of shipwrecks: 23 August 1866
Ship	State	Description
Europa	Denmark	The ship departed from Saint Croix, Virgin Islands for Copenhagen. No further trace, presumed foundered with the loss of all hands.
Golden City	United Kingdom	The ship was wrecked at Sydney, New South Wales.

== 25 August ==
List of shipwrecks: 25 August 1866
Ship	State	Description
Walvisch	United Kingdom	The ship was driven ashore 3 nautical miles (5.6 km) west of Dover, Kent. She was on a voyage from London to Montreal, Province of Canada, British North America. She was refloated and resumed her voyage.

== 26 August ==
List of shipwrecks: 26 August 1866
Ship	State	Description
Eliza Jenkins	United Kingdom	The ship sank off Lagos, Portugal. Her crew were rescued. She was on a voyage from Pomaron, Portugal to Liverpool, Lancashire.
Hero	United Kingdom	The ship was driven ashore and wrecked at Liscannor, County Clare. She was on a voyage from Liscannor to Liverpool.

== 28 August ==
List of shipwrecks: 28 August 1866
Ship	State	Description
Oceanita	United Kingdom	The ship departed from Ascension Island for Falmouth, Cornwall. No further trace, presumed foundered with the loss of all hands.

== 29 August ==
List of shipwrecks: 29 August 1866
Ship	State	Description
Countess of Durham	United Kingdom	The ship ran aground at Sunderland, County Durham. She was on a voyage from London to Sunderland. She was refloated and taken into sunderland.

== 30 August ==
List of shipwrecks: 30 August 1866
Ship	State	Description
Corrib	United Kingdom	The ship foundered in Cezimbra Bay, Portugal. Her crew were rescued. She was on a voyage from Pomaron, Portugal to Bristol Gloucestershire.
Cupid	United Kingdom	The ship ran aground at Whitby, Yorkshire. She was on a voyage from Maldon, Essex to Stockton-on-Tees, County Durham. She was refloated.
Goliah	United Kingdom	The tug was driven into the tug Hilda (United Kingdom) and both were driven out to sea from Whitby. Goliah's captain got on board Hilda, leaving a boy on board. Hilda returned to port. Goliah was driven ashore and wrecked.
Lidener	France	The ship ran aground on the Cross Sand, in the North Sea off the coast of Norfolk, United Kingdom. She was on a voyage from Mahón, Spain to Newcastle upon Tyne, Northumberland, United Kingdom. She was refloated and taken in to Great Yarmouth, Norfolk.
Maria Renée	France	The schooner foundered off the North Sand Head. Her crew were rescued by a tug. She was on a voyage from Blyth, Northumberland to Honfleur, Calvados.
Martha & Eliza	United States	The fishing schooner was run down and sunk by schooner Northerner near the Magdalen Islands. Crew saved.
North	United Kingdom	The full-rigged ship was wrecked on the Goodwin Sands, Kent. Her 31 crew took to two boats; seventeen were rescued by the Texel Lifeboat (Netherlands), and fourteen by the lugger Reform (United Kingdom). North was on a voyage from Bassein, India to Bremen.
Rose	United Kingdom	The fishing coble was driven ashore and wrecked at Whitby.
Wellington	United Kingdom	The tug ran aground on the Goodwin Sands. Her crew were rescued by the Ramsgate Lifeboat Bradford ( Royal National Lifeboat Institution).

== 31 August ==
List of shipwrecks: 31 August 1866
Ship	State	Description
Admirable	United Kingdom	The ship foundered in the Bristol Channel off Ilfracombe, Devon. Her crew were rescued. She was on a voyage from Newport, Monmouthshire to Barcelona, Spain.
Ceylon	United Kingdom	The ship departed from the Clyde for Bombay, India. No further trace, presumed foundered with the loss of all hands.

== Unknown date ==
List of shipwrecks: Unknown date in August 1866
Ship	State	Description
Anna Dressine	Russia	The ship foundered. Her crew were rescued. She was on a voyage from Saint Petersburg to a British port.
Annie	(United Kingdom of Great Britain and Ireland) British North America	The ship was sunk by ice before 17 August.
Backworth	United Kingdom	The ship was driven ashore in the Dardanelles on or before 20 August. She was on a voyage from Cagliari, Sicily, Italy to Constantinople, Ottoman Empire. She was refloated with the assistance of a tug.
Clyde	United Kingdom	The collier, a brig, was wrecked on the Tegeler Platte, in the North Sea before 7 August.
Como	United Kingdom	The steamship was wrecked on Ameland, Friesland, Netherlands. All on board were rescued. She was on a voyage from Danzig to Amsterdam, North Holland, Netherlands.
Fortitude	United Kingdom	The ship was wrecked near Akyab, Burma.
Highflyer	United Kingdom	The ship was driven ashore at "Langsham". She was refloated.
Isabella	United Kingdom	The ship caught fire at Maceió, Brazil.
J. B. Elliott	United States	The ship was wrecked. She was on a voyage from Manzanilla, Trinidad to New York.
Jean Baptiste	France	The ship foundered off Paimbœuf, Loire-Inférieure.
Liberty	United Kingdom	The ship foundered off Vigo, Spain.
Madaweska	United Kingdom	The brig was driven ashore on Prince Edward Island, British North America. She was on a voyage from Richibucto, New Brunswick, British North America to Cardiff, Glamorgan.
Maitland	United States	The ship was abandoned in the North Sea. Her crew were rescued.
Malta	United Kingdom	The ship was driven ashore near Helsingborg, Sweden. She was refloated.
Mary Gillespie	United Kingdom	The ship was abandoned in the North Sea.
Nancy	United Kingdom	The schooner ran aground and sank at Lagos. Her crew were rescued. She was on a voyage from Lagos to Liverpool, Lancashire.
Nile	United Kingdom	The steamship was wrecked at Cape Trafalgar, Spain. She was on a voyage from Liverpool to Alexandria, Egypt.
Queen of India	United Kingdom	The ship departed from Manila, Spanish East Indies for San Francisco, California, United States. No further trace, presumed foundered with the loss of all hands.
Queen of the Forth	United Kingdom	The ship was wrecked off Paraíba, Brazil She was on a voyage from London to Bombay, India.
Sarah	United Kingdom	The ship ran aground in the Thanlwin downstream of Moulmein, Burma. She was on a voyage from Moulmein to Madras, India. She was refloated and towed in to "Fishing Village" in a waterlogged condition.
St. Hilda	(United Kingdom of Great Britain and Ireland) Burma	The ship foundered in the Indian Ocean before 3 August with the loss of seventeen lives. She was on a voyage form Rangoon to Bombay.
Themis	United Kingdom	The ship ran aground, broke her back and was wrecked at Alibag, India. Her crew survived. She was on a voyage from the River Tyne to Aden.
Wing	United Kingdom	The ship was destroyed by fire in the South Atlantic. Her crew were rescued.
