= Joseph S. B. Thacher =

American judge (1812–1867)

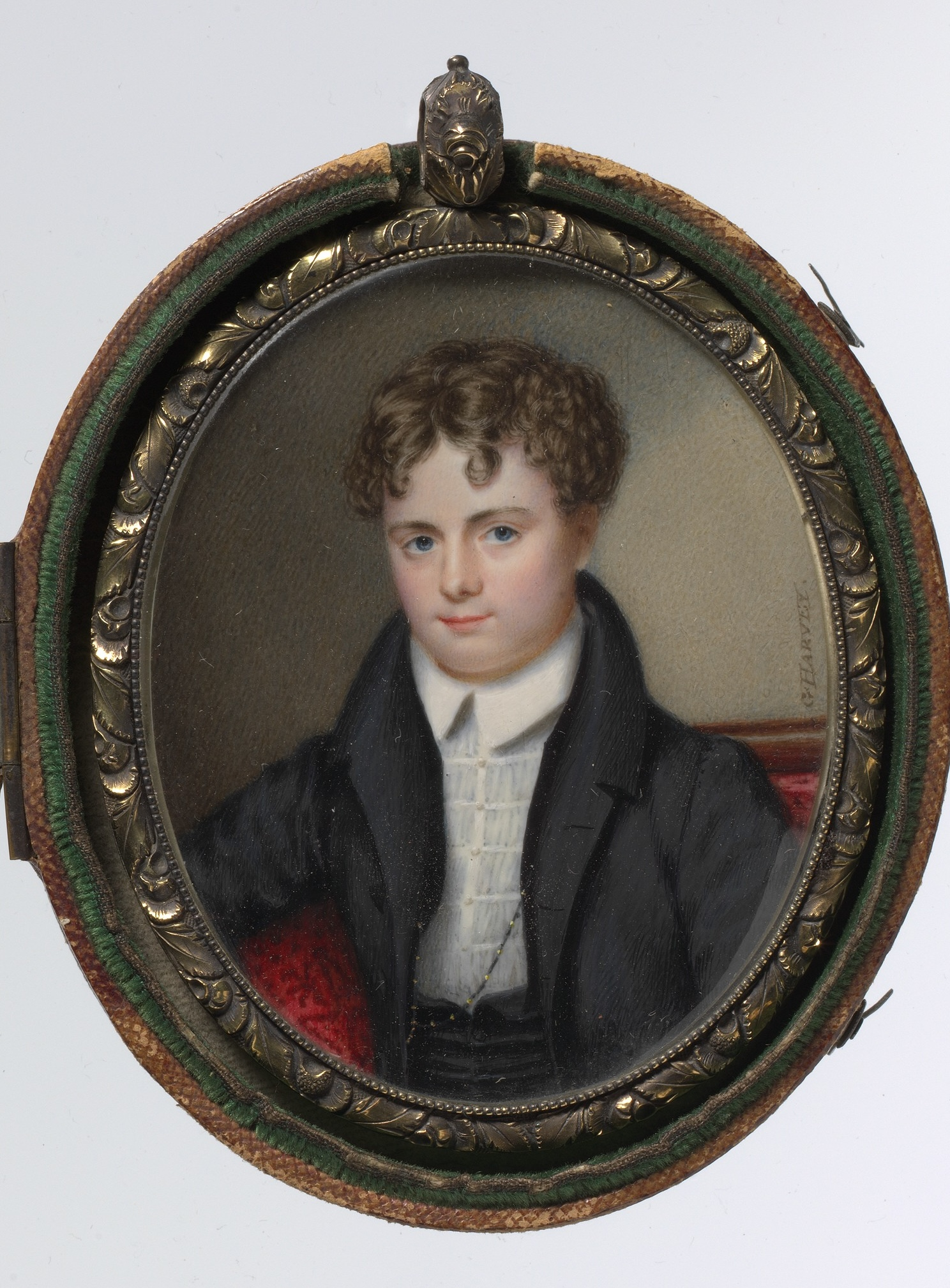
- Portrait miniature by George Harvey (Metropolitan Museum of Art object 1990.204.1)
- Born: May 11, 1812; Boston, Massachusetts
- Died: November 30, 1867 (aged 55); Natchez, Mississippi (possibly Mobile, Alabama)

Joseph Stevens Buckminster Thacher (May 11, 1812 – November 30, 1867) was an American lawyer and judge. He served as a justice of the Supreme Court of Mississippi from 1844 to 1850. Originally from Massachusetts, and a graduate of Harvard, he settled in the Natchez District of Mississippi as a young man. He was politically a Jacksonian Democrat.

== Early life, education, and career ==
Thacher was born in Boston, Massachusetts, and graduated from Harvard University. His father, P. O. Thacher, was also a judge. His grandfather Peter Thacher was an influential Protestant minister. According to Mississippi legal historian James D. Lynch, "He was a descendant of Oxenbridge Thacher, who was employed in connection with James Otis, by merchants of Boston, in 1761, to defend them against the Writs of Assistance, and whom John Adams says the advocates of the Crown hated more than they did Otis or Samuel Adams."

Thacher arrived in Natchez in the early 1830s, supposedly drawn by the fame of advocates "Prentiss, Walker, and other natives of the North." There was an inferior "criminal court" in southwestern Mississippi from 1830 to 1840, "having concurrent jurisdiction with the respective circuit courts over all crimes was established in the counties of Warren, Claiborne, Jefferson, Adams, and Wilkinson." John I. Guion presided in 1830, and then was replaced by J. S. B. Thacher.

He was a participant in the Washington Lyceum intellectual group in the late 1830s and published on "The Philosophy of Law" in the group's short-lived publication, The South-Western Journal. He was also involved in an effort to expand the public schools of Mississippi under an act passed by the state legislature in 1846; historian Dunbar Rowland credits him with having "devised a scheme of popular education which really formed the basis of discussion during the campaign of 1845."

== Judicial service and later life ==
In the year 1844 he was first elected to the Mississippi bench "after 'a spirited political canvass, entirely incompatible with the nature and dignity of the office.' According to Lynch, during the campaign "charges of a serious nature were circulated, connecting him with some dishonorable transaction in the city of Boston...These, after a series of criminations, recriminations, and a lengthy vindicatory correspondence, were finally cleared away." Thacher was elected to the bench at a time when the political power that had once been centralized at Natchez was waning, including the relocation of many legal and judicial lights to Vicksburg or the new capital of Jackson. He and Edward Turner were the only Mississippi Supreme Court judges elected from the Natchez area in the period from the 1830s to the American Civil War.

When his term expired in 1849, he was defeated by Judge C. P. Smith "and it is said that this result was contributed to by charges of unfair practices employed on his first election. At the same time, he was a man of pure morals, and social attractions of a high order. As a judge, he was laborious, impartial and upright." According to Lynch, writing in 1881, "...during the canvass was charged with having procured, during [Thacher]'s candidacy in 1843, the publication of articles highly disparaging to the character of his opponent, and savoring of a detestable egotism. These articles appeared in an Extra [edition] of the Gallatin Signal, and were secretly circulated a few days preceding the election, over the signature of the editor, who, during the canvass of 1849, upon application being made to him in regard to the matter by the gentlemen of the bar and others of Natchez, swore to the procuration of Judge Thacher, and disclosed his letter arranging the terms and suggesting a schedule for the circulation of the articles." Lynch claimed that Smith, though part of the less-popular Whig Party and "an avowed adrocate of the liability of the State for the payment of the bonds of the Union Bank," was a superior legal–judicial talent whereas, "It cannot be claimed for Mr. Justice Thacher that he was a lawyer of comparatively much depth of professional learning. His talents were more of the literary order than professional. He was a strenuous advocate of the cause of education, was much devoted to science and the fine arts, and wrote literary essays of considerable merit."

In the 1850s he was involved enough in John A. Quitman's "an empire for slavery" filibuster schemes that he was indicted along with Quitman, John Henderson, and Felix Huston on charges of violating "the federal neutrality law."

At the time of his death he was described as a "bachelor" and "a most agreeable gentleman, of very polished manners and great and varied scholarship, and universally esteemed in Mississippi." Heart disease was the cause of death. His passing was described as "startlingly sudden". He may have died in Mobile, Alabama.

== Additional images ==
Joseph S. B. Thacher
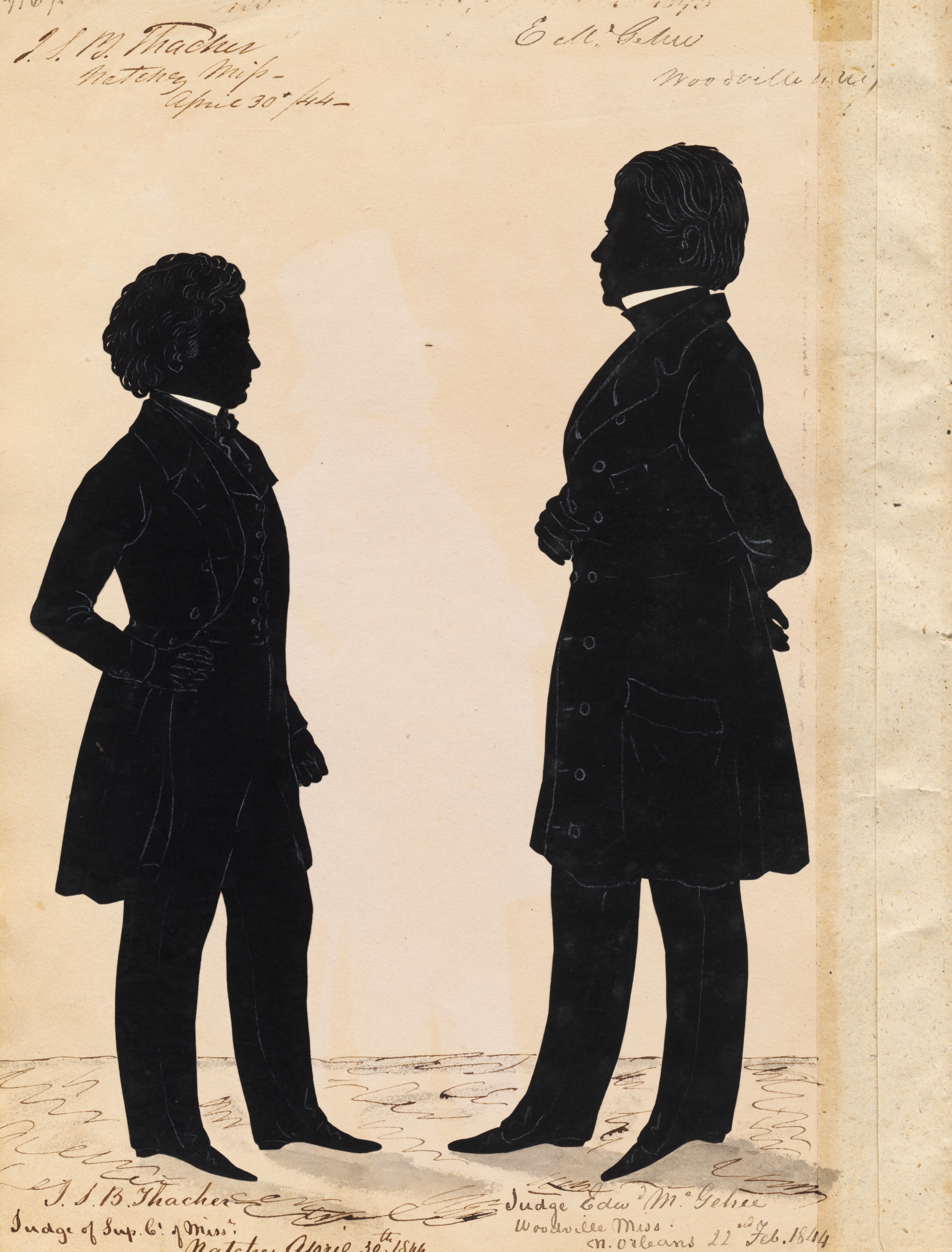
Joseph Thacher and Edward McGehee

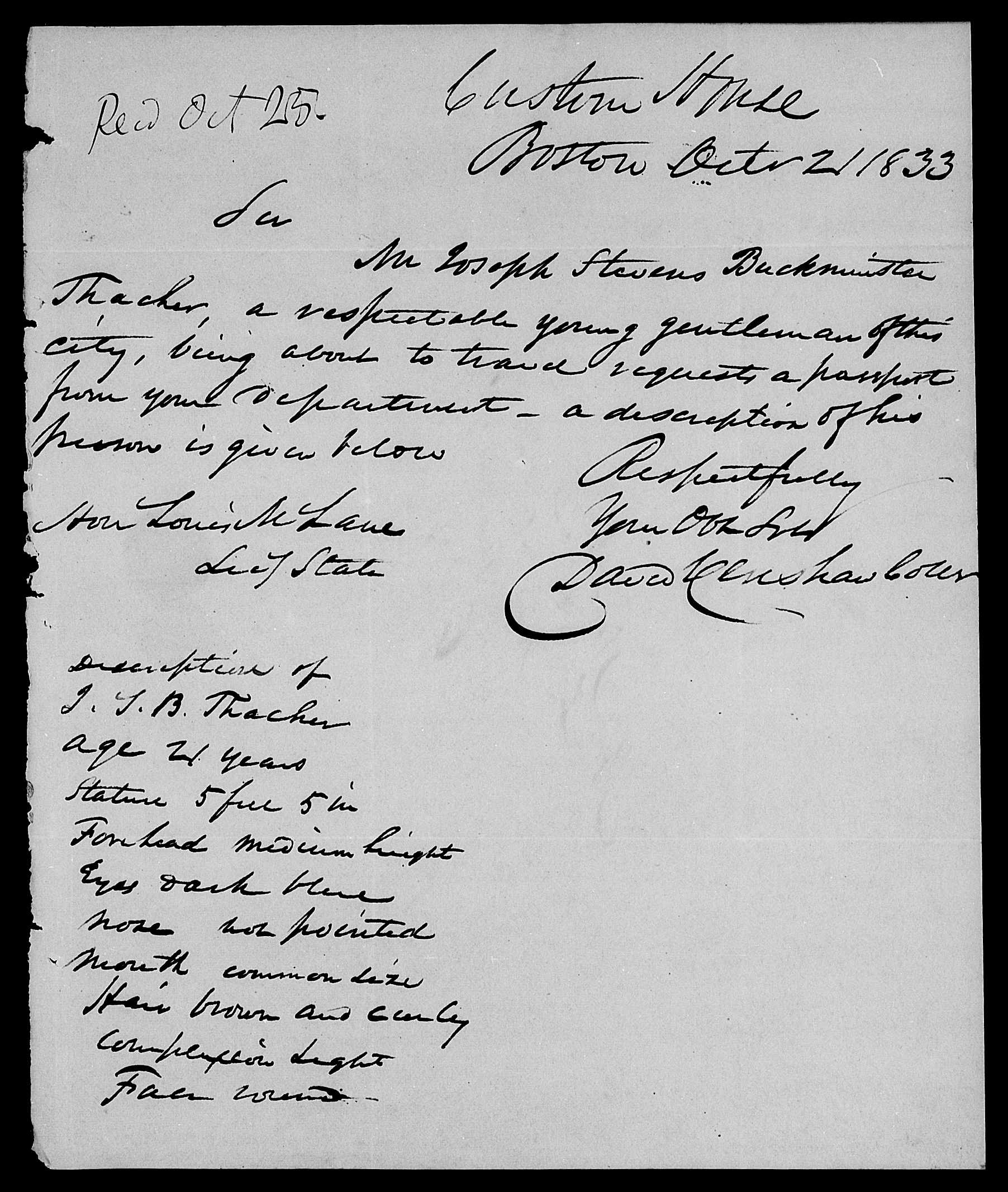
Passport application, 1833

== See also ==
- List of justices of the Supreme Court of Mississippi
- Joseph Stevens Buckminster

== Sources ==
- — (1891). Biographical and historical memoirs of Mississippi, embracing an authentic and comprehensive account of the chief events in the history of the state and a record of the lives of many of the most worthy and illustrious families and individuals. Chicago: Goodspeed Publishing Co. – via Allen County Public Library Genealogy Center.
- James, D. Clayton (1993) [1968]. Antebellum Natchez. Baton Rouge, Louisiana: Louisiana State University Press. ISBN 978-0-8071-1860-3. LCCN 68028496. OCLC 28281641.
- Lynch, J. D. (1881). The Bench and Bar of Mississippi. New York: E.J. Hale & Son. LCCN 09015735. OCLC 4838263. OL 32833023M.
- Rowland, Dunbar (1925). History of Mississippi, the Heart of the South. Jackson, Mississippi: S. J. Clarke Publishing Co. LCCN 26013501. OCLC 1852673.
- Southwick, Leslie (1998). "Mississippi Supreme Court Elections: A Historical Perspective 1916–1996". Mississippi College Law Review. 18 (1): 115–198. ISSN 0277-1152. 18 Miss. C. L. Rev. 115 (1997–1998).

Political offices
Preceded by Edward Turner	Justice of the Supreme Court of Mississippi; 1843–1850	Succeeded by Cotesworth P. Smith
