= David W. Hurst =

David W. Hurst (c. 1820s – 1882) was a justice of the Supreme Court of Mississippi in 1863, and nominally until 1865.

Born in Amite County, Mississippi, both of Hurst's parents died in his childhood, and his education thereafter "was such as could be got in the local schools [in the 1830s], by boys of limited means". Hurst began reading law "before he had attained his majority", and after gaining admission to the bar in Mississippi, practiced law for forty years in that state. During the American Civil War, Hurst was a colonel in the 33rd Mississippi Infantry Regiment. An 1899 history of the court noted that Hurst "was in October, 1863, elected to fill the unexpired term of Justice Smith, but the courts were then closed and his occupancy of the bench was merely nominal".

Hurst did not seek reelection.

He died at his home in Pike County, Mississippi, in his fifties.

Political offices
Preceded by Cotesworth P. Smith	Justice of the Supreme Court of Mississippi; 1863–1863	Succeeded by Court reorganized
