= Fashion (steamboat) =

1866 Mississippi River disaster

Fashion was a Mississippi River steamboat that caught fire and burned on December 27, 1866, resulting in 43 fatalities. The boat was carrying 2,700 highly flammable cotton bales. According to one source, the burning of the Fashion "and the heroism of the engineer who stuck to his boat that gave the inspiration for John Hay's best-known poem, 'Jim Bludsoe.'" Frank Leslie's Illustrated Newspaper covered the disaster and published several etchings illustrating the incident. Among the passengers who survived was former Confederate States Senator Gustavus A. Henry.
