= Thomas Green (CSA) =

Lawyer, Confederate sympathizer (d. 1883)

Thomas Greene (died 1883) was a Washington, D.C. lawyer, who was widely regarded as a sympathizer and even espionage agent on behalf of the Confederate States of America during the American Civil War.

Greene's third wife was Anne Corbin Lomax, sister of CSA Gnl Lunsford L. Lomax.

Thomas Nelson Conrad set up his covert intelligence gathering operation in the large Van Ness Mansion, owned by Greene, at the corner of Constitution and 17th in the heart of Washington, D.C. Greene had helped Conrad earlier, was a known CSA sympathizer, and a close relative of the wife of CSA Intelligence Major Cornelius Boyle. They were familiar with Preston Parr, John Surratt and Lewis Powell.

In 1864, Samuel Arnold was arrested for a plot to kidnap Abraham Lincoln and hide him in Greene's mansion until the hostage could be brought across the river and to the safekeeping of Mosby's Raiders, in which Greene had two sons serving. Greene and his wife were also arrested on April 18, held for thirty days and then released - during which time Greene wrote a request that if they were to remain imprisoned his mansion would be turned over for safekeeping to Thomas Shankland. Evidence against them included the fact that his wife had written out a portion of Shakespeare's Hamlet.
