= 6th Missouri Infantry Regiment (Confederate) =

Infantry regiment of the Confederate States Army

6th Missouri Infantry
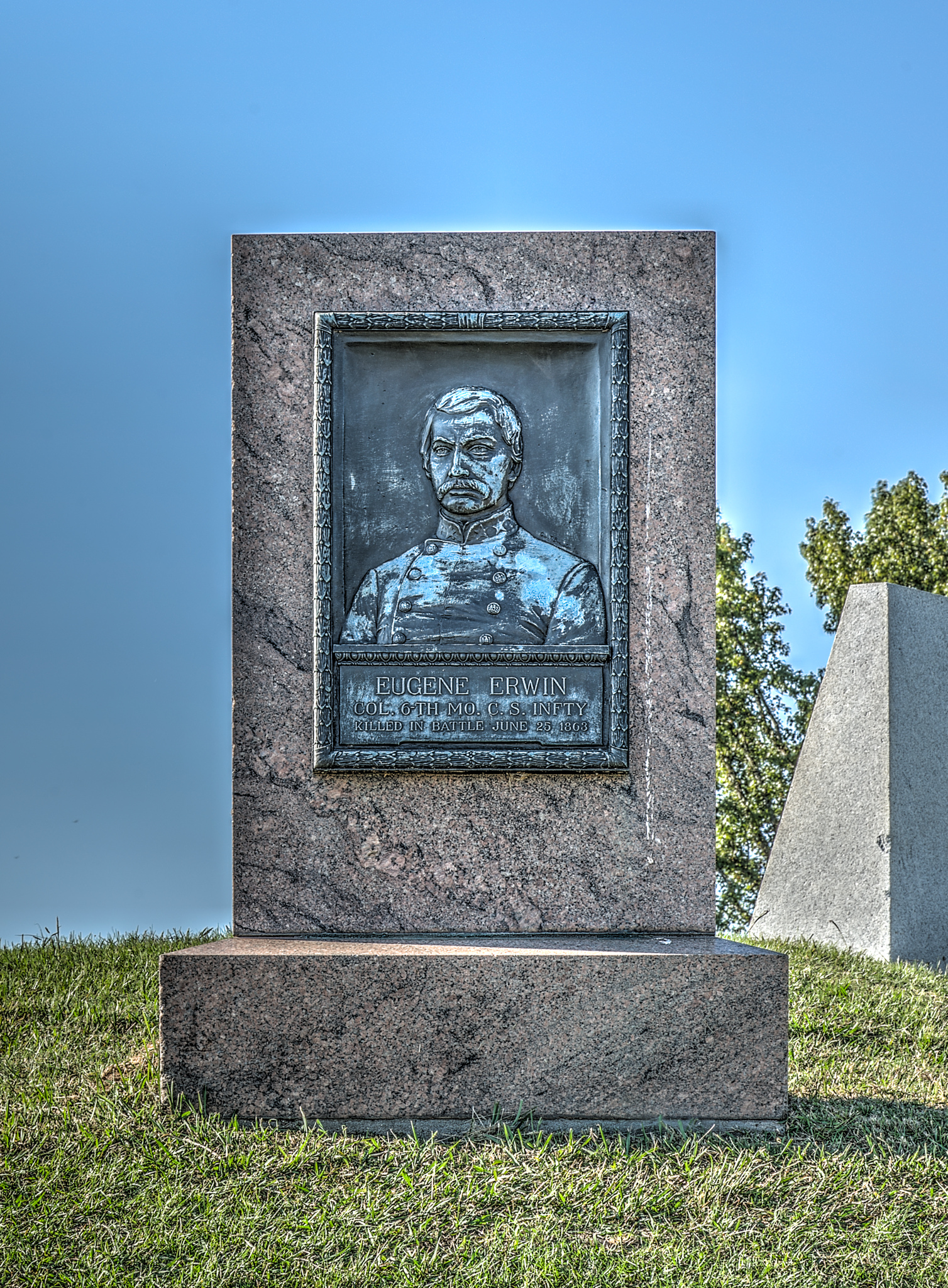
- Relief portrait of Eugene Erwin at Vicksburg National Military Park
- Active: August 26, 1862 to October 6, 1863
- Country: Confederate States of America
- Branch: Confederate States Army
- Type: Infantry
- Engagements: Battle of Iuka; Second Battle of Corinth; Battle of Grand Gulf; Battle of Port Gibson; Battle of Champion Hill; Battle of Big Black River Bridge; Siege of Vicksburg

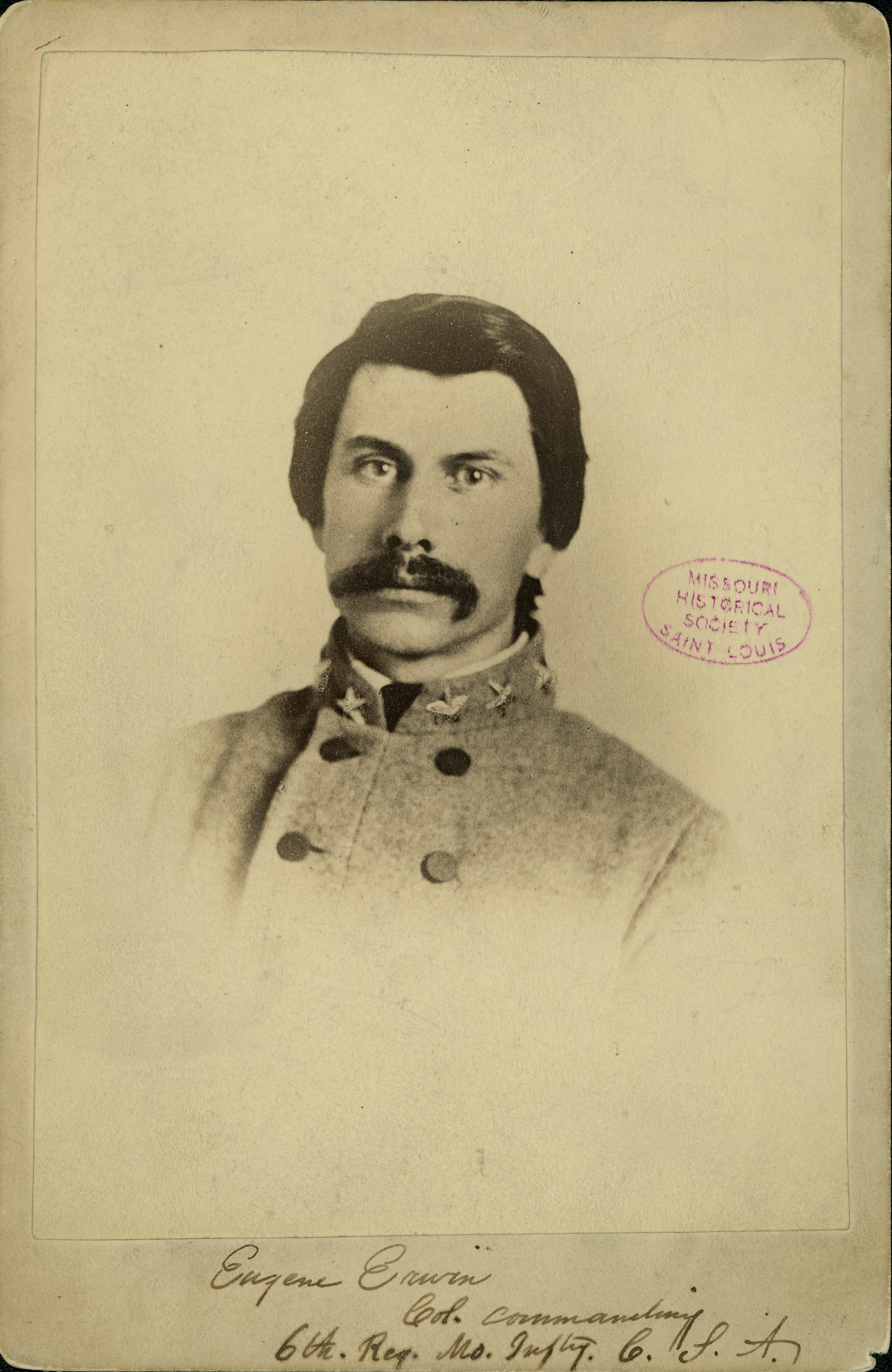
Col. Andrew Eugene Erwin

The 6th Missouri Infantry was an infantry regiment of the Confederate States Army during the American Civil War. The regiment was formed on August 26, 1862, when two existing units were combined. Later that year, the regiment was then lightly engaged at the Battle of Iuka and saw heavy action at the Second Battle of Corinth. In 1863, the regiment was engaged at the Battle of Port Gibson, and was part of a major charge at the Battle of Champion Hill. After a defeat at the Battle of Big Black River Bridge, the regiment took part in the siege of Vicksburg, where it saw heavy fighting. The siege of Vicksburg ended on July 4 with a Confederate surrender; after being exchanged, the regiment combined with the 2nd Missouri Infantry to form the 2nd and 6th Missouri Infantry (Consolidated). The 6th Missouri Infantry ceased to exist as a separate unit.

== Organization ==
The 6th Missouri Infantry was mustered on August 26, 1862, at Guntown, Mississippi, as the result of consolidation of several existing units. The bulk of the regiment came from Erwin's Battalion, although Hedgpeth's Battalion also contributed. Two artillery batteries who had not been issued cannons were reclassified to infantry; the men of these two batteries were merged into the 6th Missouri Infantry. The regiment's first colonel was Andrew Eugene Erwin, former commander of Erwin's Battalion. Isaac Newton Hedgpeth, former commander of Hedgpeth's Battalion, was appointed lieutenant colonel; Joseph P. Vaughn was the regiment's original major. On the date of muster, the regiment's original organization was:

- Company "A": Cass County, Missouri and Jackson County, Missouri. Commanded by Francis M. McKinney.
- Company "B": Jackson County, Missouri and Lafayette County, Missouri. Commanded by Samuel F. Taylor.
- Company "C": Boone County, Missouri and Howard County, Missouri. Commanded by Stephen Cooper.
- Company "D": Cape Girardeau County, Missouri and Stoddard County, Missouri. Commanded by Albert A. Woodard.
- Company "E": Jackson County, Missouri and Johnson County, Missouri. Commanded by Jeptha Duncan.
- Company "F": Cass County, Missouri and St. Clair County, Missouri. Commanded by John M. Wiedemeyer.
- Company "G": Clay County, Missouri and Platte County, Missouri. Commanded by John B. Clark.
- Company "H": Howard County, Missouri. Commanded by John M. Hickey.
- Company "I": Cape Girardeau County, Missouri and Scott County, Missouri. Commanded by John D. Parsons.
- Company "K": Cape Girardeau County, Missouri, Ripley County, Missouri, Wayne County, Missouri, and Arkansas. Commanded by Alvah G. Kelsey.

Companies "A", "B", "C", "E", "F", "G", and "H" contained men from Erwin's Battalion. Companies "I" and "K" were from Hedgpeth's Battalion, and Company "D" was composed of the men from the two artillery units.

=== Component units ===
Hedgpeth's Battalion had been formed in April 1862 when several elements of the Missouri State Guard, commanded by militia officer M. Jeff Thompson, were transferred to Fort Pillow and Fort Pickering near Memphis, Tennessee. The battalion served on Confederate States Navy ships during the Battle of Plum Point Bend on May 10, and later became part of the First Confederate Infantry Regiment on July 10. On August 25, the battalion was detached from the 1st Confederate Infantry, and became part of the 6th Missouri Infantry on August 26. Erwin's Battalion had been organized on May 16, 1862, by consolidating Clark's Missouri Battalion and Rosser's Missouri Battalion. The battalion performed garrison duty at Corinth, Mississippi until the Confederates evacuated the town at the end of the month. Afterwards, the battalion performed guard duty in northern Mississippi until the unit became part of the 6th Missouri Infantry on August 26. Harris's Missouri Battery had entered Confederate service on January 1, 1862. After participating in a skirmish near Sikeston, Missouri on February 28, the battery transferred to Fort Pillow. Since the battery did not have cannons, it served as infantry; seeing action at the Battle of Plum Point Bend on May 10. On July 2, the battery was merged into Hedgpeth's Battalion, although about 60 men were detached to man the cannons of the ironclad CSS Arkansas on July 15. On August 26, the battery became part of the 6th Missouri Infantry. McDonald's Missouri Battery had officially joined the Confederate States Army on March 13, 1862, although many of the men of the battery had seen prior service in the Missouri State Guard. On April 28, the battery's cannons were transferred to the Arkansas Appeal Battery, and McDonald's Battery was sent to Fort Pillow. After seeing action at the Battle of Plum Point Bend on May 10, the battery served as infantry and became part of the 6th Missouri on August 26.

== Service history ==
=== 1862 ===
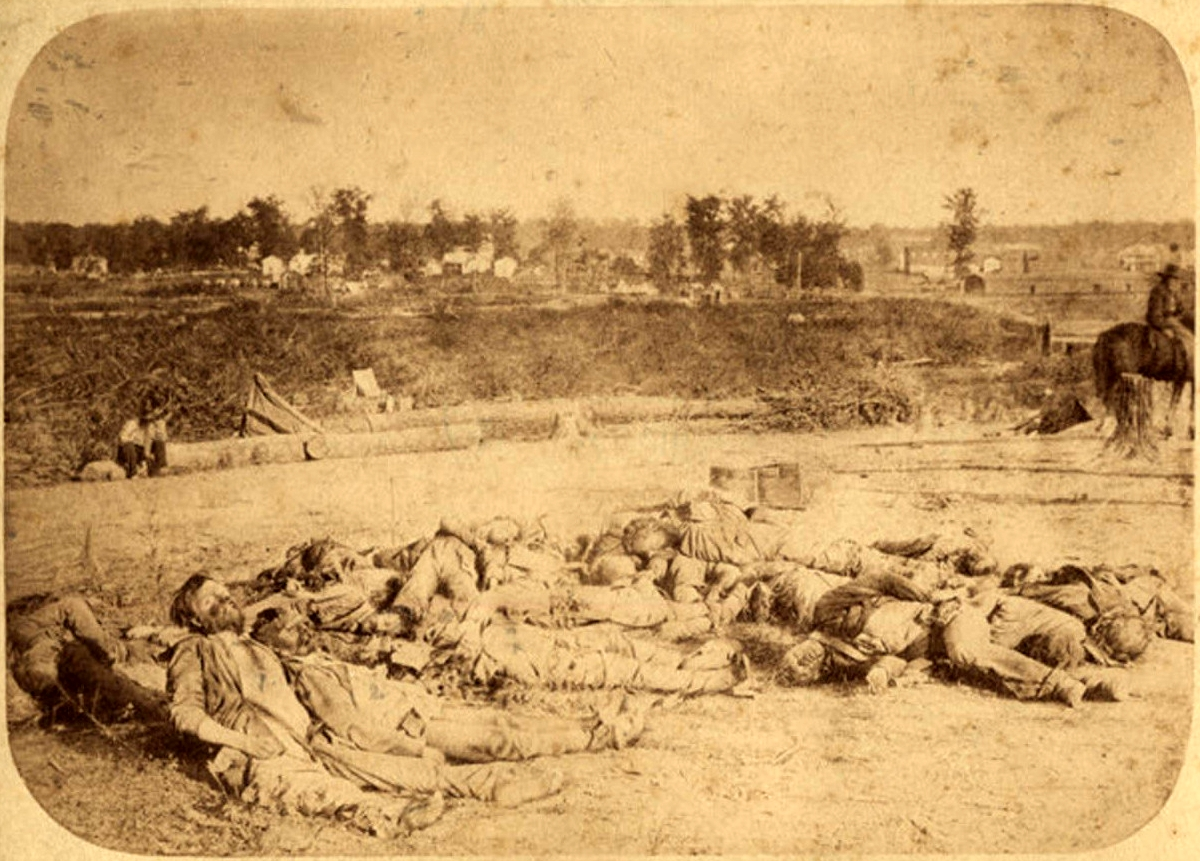
Confederate dead on the field of the Second Battle of Corinth

On September 19, 1862, the regiment was exposed to artillery fire at the Battle of Iuka, but was otherwise unengaged. At the Second Battle of Corinth on October 3 and 4, the regiment was part of the brigade of Brigadier General Martin E. Green as part of Brigadier General Louis Hébert's division of Major General Sterling Price's corps of Major General Earl Van Dorn's Army of West Tennessee. Also in Green's brigade were the 7th Mississippi Infantry Battalion, 43rd Mississippi Infantry, 4th Missouri Infantry, 3rd Missouri Cavalry, Guibor's Battery, and Landis's Battery.

On the first day at Corinth (October 3), the 6th Missouri, as well as the rest of Green's brigade (less the artillery), began a charge against the Union line defended by Brigadier General Thomas A. Davies' division. The Confederates met with heavy Union fire, and a cabin in the path of the 6th Missouri threw the regiment's ranks into confusion. After about 15 minutes, Green's brigade was forced to withdraw. Another attempt at a Confederate charge was broken by a counterattack by the 2nd Iowa Infantry, the Iowans' attack hit the 6th Missouri the hardest. Green's brigade was forced to withdraw again. Reinforced by elements of Colonel Elijah Gates' brigade and supported by the brigade of Brigadier General Charles W. Phifer, Green's brigade, including the 6th Missouri, made another charge, eventually driving the Union forces from their line. Despite having a clear path to attack the Union interior line, the Confederate advance was halted by Price due to fatigue and disorganization in the Confederate ranks.

On October 4, Green was promoted to division command due to Hébert falling ill. Command of Green's brigade then fell to Colonel William H. Moore. Moore's brigade made a charge against the Union interior line. After driving in Union skirmishers, the Confederates came under heavy fire from a fortification known as Battery Powell. A sergeant of the 6th Missouri described the charge by stating that "great gaps were thrown in their ranks [...] every instant death smote." Moore's brigade broke through the Union lines and began driving into the town of Corinth itself. Moore's brigade would be reinforced by elements of Phifer's and Brigadier General John C. Moore's brigades, but a Union counterattack drove the Confederates out of Corinth, ending the threat. The 6th Missouri suffered 223 casualties at Corinth, including Lieutenant Colonel Hedgpeth, who was severely wounded, and Major Vaughn, who was killed. After escaping a Union trap at the Battle of Davis Bridge on October 5, the 6th Missouri was assigned to the First Missouri Brigade on October 22.

=== 1863 ===
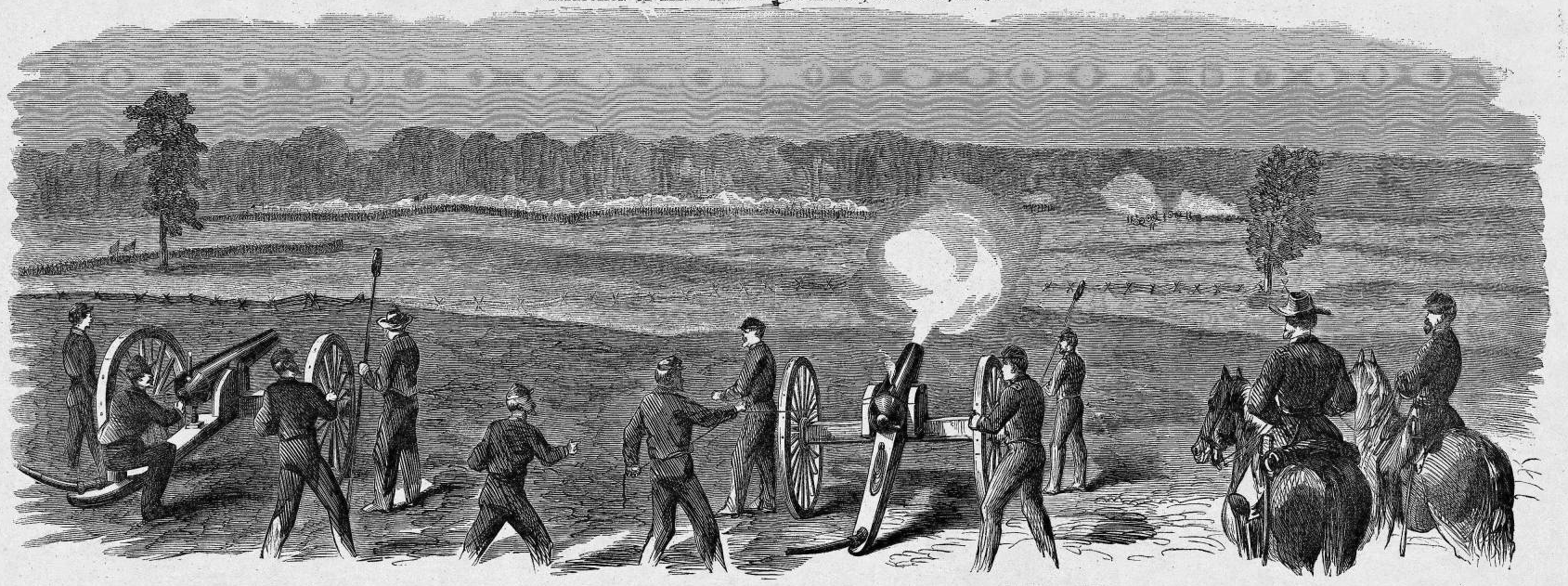
Battle of Champion Hill

In early 1863, the 6th Missouri was transferred to Grand Gulf, Mississippi, where the regiment help construct fortifications. The regiment was present at the Battle of Grand Gulf on April 29. Along with many of the other men of the First Missouri Brigade, the 6th Missouri was shifted to Port Gibson, Mississippi on May 1 to counter a Union landing. At the Battle of Port Gibson, which took place on May 1, the 6th Missouri was used to support the right wing of the Confederate line. When Union troops threatened to cut off the Confederate route of retreat, the 6th Missouri counterattacked. The charge drove deep into the Union line, but was forced to retreat some distance when it encountered Union reinforcements. The 6th Missouri became isolated from the rest of the Confederate force, began to run out of ammunition, and was forced to make a fighting retreat to rejoin the main Confederate force as it retreated.

At the Battle of Champion Hill on May 16, Company "E" of the 6th Missouri was detached with four companies from other regiments of the First Missouri Brigade to serve as a skirmishing unit. Later in the battle, the First Missouri Brigade was used to fill a breach in the Confederate line; the 6th Missouri was posted on the left of the brigade's line. The First Missouri Brigade eventually began a counterattack to stabilize the Confederate line. The Confederates drove the Union line back over a mile, although at the cost of heavy casualties. One soldier participating in the charge wrote that "the blood ran in a stream, as water would have done." The charge of the Missourians broke through the Union line, capturing a crossroads and Champion Hill itself, both of which were strategic points on the field. However, Union reinforcements commanded by Brigadier General Marcellus M. Crocker arrived, and the Missourians withdrew after more fighting.

On May 17, the 6th Missouri was part of a Confederate force tasked with holding the crossing of the Big Black River. In the ensuing Battle of Big Black River Bridge, the Confederate line was broken, and a rout for the river crossing ensued. The 6th Missouri did not receive clear withdrawal orders, and did not withdraw from the line until the regiment was almost surrounded. After the retreat across the Big Black River, the 6th Missouri entered the defenses of Vicksburg, and took part in the siege of Vicksburg. On May 19, the 6th Missouri Infantry, along with the 1st and 4th Missouri Infantry (Consolidated) and the 5th Missouri Infantry, were used to plug weak points in the Vicksburg defensive perimeter. On May 22, the 6th Missouri strengthened the Confederate line near a point known as the Stockade Redan, helping to repulse Union attacks.

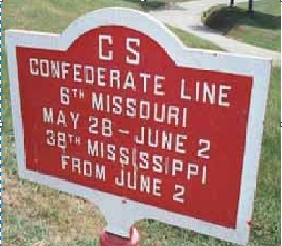
Marker for the 6th Missouri Infantry at Vicksburg National Military Park

On June 25, a mine was detonated under a point of the Confederate line named the Third Louisiana Redan. The 6th Missouri was used to plug the gap created by the explosion. Sharp fighting followed as Union infantry attempted to exploit the new gap. However, the Confederate line, which contained the 6th Missouri, the 5th Missouri, and the survivors of the 3rd Louisiana Infantry held after much hand-to-hand fighting. Both sides used makeshift hand grenades in the fighting. Colonel Erwin was killed early in the action. On July 1, another mine was detonated under the position of Companies "B" and "H" of the 6th Missouri. Many of the men of the 6th Missouri were killed in the explosion. While Union artillery shelled the gap created by the explosion, a large-scale infantry assault did not occur. The 6th Missouri lost 56 men on July 1. On July 4, the Confederate defenders of Vicksburg surrendered, and the 216 survivors of the 6th Missouri were paroled. The men reported to Demopolis, Alabama, and were eventually exchanged. On October 6, the 6th Missouri Infantry was combined with the 2nd Missouri Infantry to form the 2nd and 6th Missouri Infantry (Consolidated); the 6th Missouri ceased to exist as a separate unit.

== Legacy ==
The men of the 6th Missouri formed Companies "B", "C", "D", and "H" of the 2nd and 6th Missouri (Consolidated); Companies "A", "E", "F", "G", "I", and "K" were composed of men from the 2nd Missouri. Colonel Peter C. Flournoy of the 2nd Missouri commanded the new regiment. The consolidated regiment saw extensive action in the Atlanta campaign in 1864, including fighting at the Battle of Kennesaw Mountain on June 27. On October 5, the regiment fought at the Battle of Allatoona. The consolidated regiment suffered heavy casualties at the Battle of Franklin on November 30; it missed the Battle of Nashville in mid-December. On April 9, 1865, the regiment surrendered at the Battle of Fort Blakeley.

Thomas F. Harney, a former member of the 6th Infantry was later assigned to torpedo ordnance and arrested in the closing days of the war en route to bomb the White House with assistance from Cornelius Boyle and Mosby's Raiders.

== Sources ==
- Cozzens, Peter (1997). The Darkest Days of the War: The Battles of Iuka and Corinth. Chapel Hill, North Carolina: University of North Carolina Press. ISBN 0-8078-2320-1.
- McGhee, James E. (2008). Guide to Missouri Confederate Regiments, 1861–1865. Fayetteville, Arkansas: University of Arkansas Press. ISBN 978-1-55728-870-7.
- Tucker, Phillip Thomas (1993). The South's Finest: The First Missouri Confederate Brigade From Pea Ridge to Vicksburg. Shippensburg, Pennsylvania: White Mane Publishing Co. ISBN 0-942597-31-1.
