= Thomas Nelson Conrad =

American academic administrator

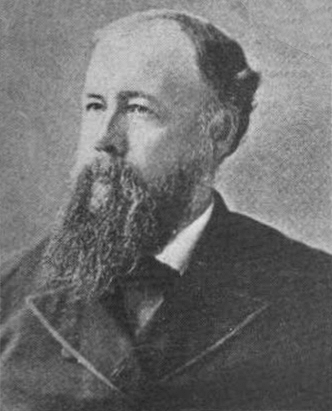

3rd President of Virginia Agricultural and Mechanical College
- In office January 17, 1882 – July 1, 1886
- Preceded by: John Lee Buchanan
- Succeeded by: Lunsford L. Lomax

Personal details
- Born: August 1, 1837 Fairfax Court House, Virginia, U.S.
- Died: January 5, 1905 (aged 67) Washington, D.C., U.S.
- Spouse: Emma T. Ball (1845-1900, her death)
- Children: 7
- Education: Dickinson College
- Occupation: Educator, soldier, chaplain, journalist, mayor

Military service
- Allegiance: Confederate States of America
- Branch/service: Confederate Secret Service

Thomas Nelson Conrad (August 1, 1837 – January 5, 1905) was the third president of Virginia Tech (then Virginia Agricultural and Mechanical College) and served in the Confederate Secret Service during the Civil War.

== Early life and education ==
Conrad was born on August 1, 1837, to Nelson Conrad and Lavenia M. Thomas, at Fairfax Court House, Virginia. He attended Dickinson College in Carlisle, Pennsylvania, where he received his bachelor's degree in 1857.

== Civil War ==
At the outbreak of the American Civil War, Conrad taught at the Georgetown Institute in Washington, D.C., which also bestowed a master's degree on him in 1860. While there, he openly expressed his sympathy for the Confederacy, and a few days after the June 1861 commencement, he was arrested and placed in the Old Capitol Prison.

Conrad was given a letter of recommendation from General Stuart to President Jefferson Davis to spy for the Confederate Secret Service. He met Davis, who endorsed the letter and referred him to other members of the Confederate government. Conrad received gold from Judah Benjamin and his “name placed on the rolls of the secret service bureau”. He then saw Secretary of War Seddon for “papers and outfit”. Davis invited Conrad to his executive mansion to hear his plans.

Captain Conrad went to Washington, D.C. with his Dickinson roommate and Phi Kappa Sigma fraternity brother Daniel Mountjoy Cloud and M. B. “Tippie” Ruggles, son of General Daniel Ruggles as couriers. His slave William also accompanied them.

Conrad set up his covert intelligence gathering operation in the large "Van Ness" estate, owned by Thomas Greene, at the corner of Constitution and 17th in the heart of Washington D.C. Greene had helped Conrad earlier, was a known CSA sympathiser, and a close relative of the wife of CSA Intelligence Major Cornelius Boyle.

His wartime exploits included among other things, hatching a plot to assassinate the Commanding General of the United States Army, Winfield Scott, that was vetoed by the Confederate government who feared that the elderly and infirm Scott would be replaced by someone more fit for command; sneaking into the War Office during lunch hour to lift copies of documents describing General McClellan's battle plans for the Peninsula Campaign, a large-scale offensive by the Union Army to capture the Confederate capitol at Richmond from the desk of a friend who was a double agent; and conspiring to kidnap U.S. President Abraham Lincoln.

In September 1864, Conrad and a team went to Washington in an attempt to kidnap President Abraham Lincoln. The members of the team were “Bull” Frizzell (who had been in the Old Capitol Prison with him), Cloud, and slave William. The plan was abandoned because Lincoln was well protected. Conrad denied that anyone in the Confederate government knew of his plot except for the military secretary of General Braxton Bragg who was aware of it. However, Seddon wrote an order for John S. Mosby and Lieutenant Cawood to “aid and facilitate the movements of Capt. Conrad.”

Conrad’s courier Ruggles assisted John Wilkes Booth by giving him a ride on his horse shortly before Booth was killed. Conrad was also a frequent visitor to Mary Surratt's tavern that was used as a safe house for Confederate spies.

Two days after Lincoln was assassinated, Conrad was arrested by a landing party of the Union vessel Jacob Bell on the night of April 16, 1865. He was put aboard a train bound for a Union prisoner of war camp but managed to escape by jumping from the moving train after the soldiers guarding him fell asleep. He vanished into the Virginia wilderness and was never re-captured.

In May 1887 Conrad wrote several articles about his activities as a spy for a Philadelphia newspaper. He later reworked these into the 1892 autobiography A Confederate Spy: A Story of the Civil War, which he later revised into the 1904 work The Rebel Scout: A Thrilling History of Scouting Life in the Southern Army.

== Post-War career ==
In 1871, Conrad was appointed principal of the Preston and Olin Institute in Blacksburg, Virginia, until it reorganized the next year as Virginia Agricultural and Mechanical College (now Virginia Tech). He then purchased the Montgomery Messenger newspaper.

Conrad served as the mayor of Blacksburg for three months in 1882 and was appointed president of Virginia Agricultural and Mechanical College the same year. During his tenure, the college switched from semesters to the quarter system, which remained in place until the late 1980s. The college spent $2,229.96 on books of fiction and poetry, and a museum was opened. For the first time, the school’s farm became financially successful. In 1886, the Board of Visitors removed all officers and faculty of the college, including Conrad.

Conrad once again became mayor of Blacksburg, this time for one month in 1887. He then joined the faculty of the Maryland Agricultural College, resigning in 1890 to accept a position with the U.S. Census Office in Washington D.C. He later retired to a farm in Prince William County.

== Personal life ==
Conrad married Emma “Minnie” Ball on October 4, 1866, and the couple had seven children.

== Death ==
Conrad died in Washington, D.C., on January 5, 1905, at age 67, and was buried in Montgomery County, Virginia.

== Legacy and honors ==
The Conrad Cavalry, the equestrian unit of the Virginia Tech Corps of Cadets, is named for Conrad who was an expert horseman.
