= 2nd and 6th Missouri Consolidated Infantry Regiment =

Infantry regiment in the Confederate States Army

2nd and 6th Missouri Infantry Regiment (Consolidated)
- Active: October 6, 1863 to April 9, 1865
- Allegiance: Confederate States of America
- Branch: Confederate States Army
- Type: Infantry
- Size: 560 (May 1864)
- Engagements: American Civil War: Battle of Kennesaw Mountain; Battle of Peachtree Creek; Siege of Atlanta; Battle of Allatoona; Battle of Franklin; Battle of Fort Blakeley

The 2nd and 6th Missouri Infantry Regiment (Consolidated) was an infantry regiment that served in the Confederate States Army during the American Civil War. The regiment was formed on October 6, 1863, when the 2nd Missouri Infantry Regiment and the 6th Missouri Infantry Regiment were consolidated. The regiment first saw major action in the 1864 Atlanta campaign, fighting in the battles of Kennesaw Mountain and Peachtree Creek, the Siege of Atlanta, and several smaller actions. After the Confederates retreated from Atlanta, the regiment was part of a force that made an unsuccessful attack against a Union garrison during the Battle of Allatoona on October 5. The regiment then followed General John Bell Hood's Confederate Army of Tennessee into Tennessee, where it charged the Union works at the Battle of Franklin on November 30. At Franklin, the regiment suffered over 60 percent casualties, including the loss of many company commanders. After Franklin, the regiment was detached from the rest of the army to build fortifications, missing the Battle of Nashville. In March 1865, the regiment was transferred to Mobile, Alabama. On April 9, 1865, the regiment was captured at the Battle of Fort Blakeley; the survivors of the regiment were paroled at Jackson, Mississippi in May after the Army of Tennessee surrendered.

== Organization ==
The 2nd Missouri Infantry Regiment and 6th Missouri Infantry Regiment had suffered heavy losses in the early stages of the American Civil War. The two regiments had been captured when the Confederate States Army surrendered Vicksburg, Mississippi on July 4, 1863. After the men of the two regiments were paroled and officially exchanged, the units were consolidated on October 6, 1863, forming a new regiment known as the 2nd and 6th Missouri Infantry Regiment (Consolidated). Colonel Peter C. Flournoy, formerly of the 2nd Missouri Infantry, commanded the new regiment. Thomas M. Carter was the consolidated unit's first lieutenant colonel, and William F. Carter was the first major. As of the consolidation date, the regiment contained ten companies. Companies A, E–G, and I contained men from the 2nd Missouri Infantry and Companies B–D, H, and K contained men from the 6th Missouri Infantry.

== Service history ==
=== Atlanta campaign and Allatoona ===
After the consolidation, the regiment was stationed at Demopolis, Alabama, where it was issued new uniforms and weapons. The 2nd and 6th Missouri Infantry, along with the rest of the First Missouri Brigade, transferred to Meridian, Mississippi on October 19, 1863. In January 1864, the brigade returned to Alabama, but was sent back to Meridian on February 5 due to the threat posed by the Union forces of Major General William T. Sherman. Later, the unit was sent back to Alabama, where it remained until the start of the Atlanta campaign in May. At the beginning of the Atlanta campaign, the regiment mustered 560 men, making it the largest unit in its brigade.

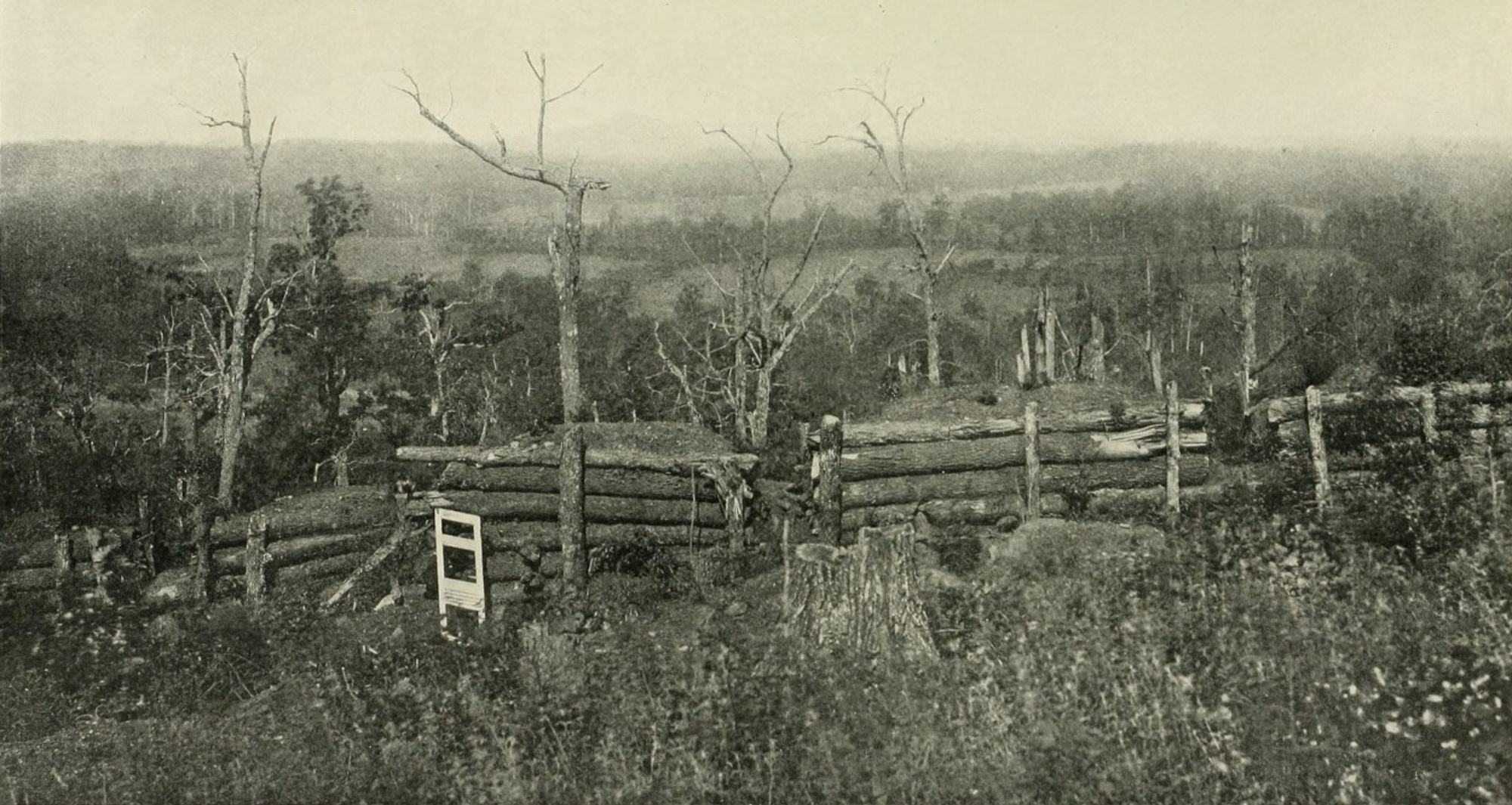
Confederate fortifications at Kennesaw Mountain

On June 18, the First Missouri Brigade was engaged in a small action in the vicinity of the Lattimer House. After this action, the brigade then fell back to Kennesaw Mountain. On June 27, the First Missouri Brigade, commanded by Brigadier General Francis M. Cockrell, defended a portion of the Confederate line at a point known as Pigeon Hill. Union skirmishers hit the Confederate line at around 8:00 a.m., followed by more Union troops. The Confederate skirmish line held for some point, but Union pressure drove in the left flank of the line. The right flank of the skirmish line was later ordered to fall back, suffering heavy losses in the retreat. Union troops then charged Cockrell's main line, but were replused. Flournoy is reported to have fought with the Confederate skirmish line. Despite having won the battle, Confederate General Joseph E. Johnston ordered a retreat from Kennesaw Mountain. On July 3 and 4, the 2nd and 6th Missouri Infantry saw light action near Smyrna, Georgia; several men of the regiment were killed in the actions. The First Missouri Brigade was present at the Battle of Peachtree Creek on July 20. While Major General Samuel Gibbs French, commanding the division the 2nd and 6th Missouri Infantry was in, reported that only skirmishers of his division were engaged, a lieutenant in the 3rd and 5th Missouri Infantry Regiment (Consolidated) wrote that the First Missouri Brigade was subject to "hot and heavy" fire for five hours during the battle.

After Peachtree Creek, the regiment fell back to Atlanta, Georgia. The 2nd and 6th Missouri Infantry was left to defend the Atlanta fortifications during the July 28 Battle of Ezra Church, and missed a bloody Confederate defeat. During the Siege of Atlanta, the 2nd and 6th Missouri Infantry and the rest of the First Missouri Brigade defended a portion of the northwestern edge of the city. The regiment saw action throughout the siege, until the Confederates abandoned the city. (Note: The First Missouri Brigade left the city on September 2.) At that point, the regiment transferred to Lovejoy's Station, Georgia. The Confederate positions at Lovejoy's Station were rather weak and were subjected to enfilade fire from Union artillery. While stationed at Lovejoy's Station, some of the men of the 2nd and 6th Missouri Infantry were engaged in a small action on September 6. Over the course of the entire Atlanta campaign, the regiment reported 196 casualties.

In October, General John Bell Hood, commander of the Army of Tennessee, sent French's division against a Union outpost at Allatoona, Georgia. At the Battle of Allatoona on October 5, the 2nd and 6th Missouri Infantry was aligned on the left of the First Missouri Brigade. The Confederate charge hit the Union line hard, but the main Union position was not taken. The First Missouri Brigade charged the Union works at least four times. Eventually, Union reinforcements threatened to cut French's line of retreat, and the Confederates fell back from the field. The 2nd and 6th Missouri Infantry lost 91 men at Allatoona.

=== Franklin and Fort Blakely ===
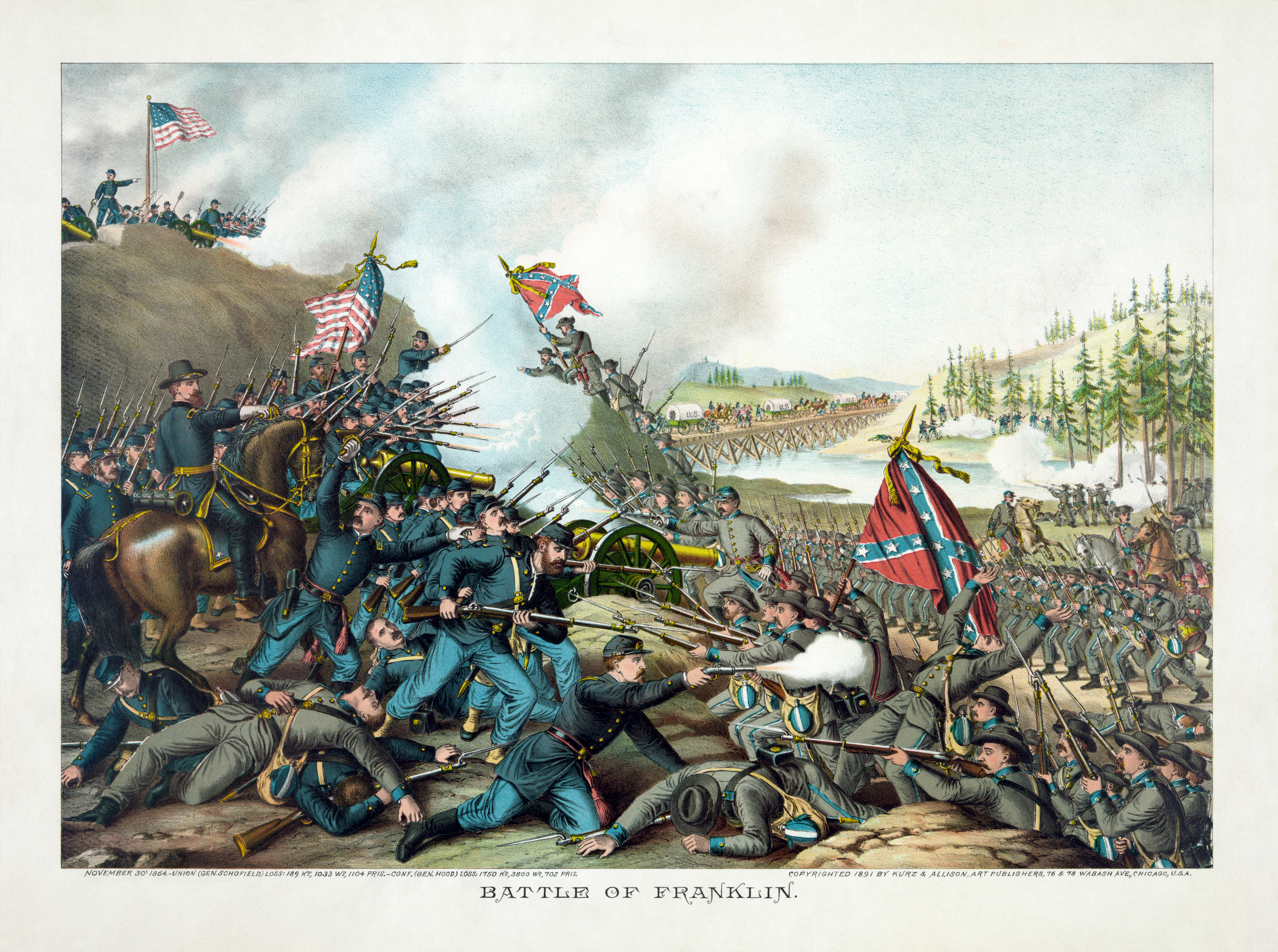
Battle of Franklin

After Allatoona, the regiment moved into Tennessee along with Hood's army. The regiment then fought at the Battle of Franklin on November 30. The 2nd and 6th Missouri Infantry was on the left of the brigade's line during the charge. Once the charge hit the Union line, a portion of the brigade was crowded behind Major General John C. Brown's division as the Confederate attacked a farm owned by the Carter family. Some of the Union troops had been placed forward of the main Union line, and these troops were driven back. However, once the Confederates got close to the main Union line, heavy fire met the attackers. Company G of the regiment saw 21 of its 30 members killed or wounded. The regiment's flag was captured during the fight. Cockrell was taken out of the fight with multiple wounds. Franklin cost the 2nd and 6th Missouri Infantry 164 men, which was over 60 percent of the unit's strength. Eight company commanders were among the Franklin casualties.

After Franklin, the regiment advanced to the Nashville, Tennessee area on December 2. On December 10, the regiment was detached to the Duck River to build fortifications. The regiment did not rejoin the rest of the Army of Tennessee until January 1865, missing the Battle of Nashville. After spending the winter in Mississippi, the regiment was transferred to Mobile, Alabama in late March, where the regiment was part of the garrison of Fort Blakely. At the Battle of Fort Blakeley on April 9, the 2nd and 6th Missouri Infantry was holding a position known as Redoubt Four. Despite a spirited defense by the Confederates, the position was quickly overrun. Cockrell and 2nd and 6th Missouri Infantry surrendered in the works. The survivors of the regiment were sent to Ship Island, Mississippi for some time before being transferred to Jackson, Mississippi, where the men were paroled in May. The rest of the Army of Tennessee had surrendered on April 26.

== See also ==
- List of Missouri Confederate Civil War units

== Sources ==
- Gottschalk, Phil (1991). In Deadly Earnest: The Missouri Brigade. Columbia, Missouri: Missouri River Press. ISBN 0-9631136-1-5.
- Luvaas, Jay; Nelson, Harold W. (2008). Guide to the Atlanta Campaign: Rocky Face Ridge to Kennesaw Mountain. Lawrence, Kansas: University Press of Kansas. ISBN 978-0-7006-1570-4.
- McGhee, James E. (2008). Guide to Missouri Confederate Regiments, 1861–1865. Fayetteville, Arkansas: University of Arkansas Press. ISBN 978-1-55728-870-7.
- Sword, Wiley (1992). Embrace an Angry Wind. New York City: Harper Collins. ISBN 0-06-016301-1.
- The Photographic History of the American Civil War. New York, New York: The Fairfax Press. 1989. ISBN 0-517-69266-X.
