= Thomas F. Harney =

Thomas F. Harney was a Confederate explosives expert, who was arrested by the Union Army in the final days of the US Civil War, seemingly en route to bomb the White House. While his initial capture was dismissed as immaterial, as he explained he was a simple engineer delivering ordnance to Mosby, postwar memoirs of Mosby's partisans noted Harney's capture was disastrous and it became clear that he'd been intended to carry out the bombing of the White House.

Born in Blair County, Pennsylvania, Harney was a teacher by profession and formerly of the 6th Missouri Infantry.

== Plot ==
“List of prisoners and property captured: Richard McVey (wounded severely), Edward Hefflebower, Thomas F. Harney, Engineer Bureau, Lieutenant Company F, Sixth Missouri brought ordnance to Colonel Mosby and joined his command; First Sergeant David G. Mohler, Company H, Samuel Rogers. Six horses captured. Six or 8 horses killed; 7 complete sets of horse equipments. The road from Mr. Arundel’s to Wolf Run Shoals was strewn with blankets, hats, caps, etc. I have no doubt a number of the enemy were wounded and probably some killed that were got away through the woods

— Union Col. Charles Albright, 1865 Report of the Skirmish

On March 22, 1865, John Wilkes Booth, Sarah Slater, and colleagues met at the St. Nicholas Hotel in New York City where they learned that the White House had an underground entrance beneath the cabinet offices. They had no explosives or expertise to use that information.

On March 25, Slater was at the Surratt boardinghouse and tavern although her escort, Augustus Howell, had just been arrested. John Surratt accompanied her to meet Judah Benjamin on March 29 in Richmond, Virginia, where he rented a room as "Harry Sherman". Benjamin withdrew US$1,500 in gold, giving US$200 to Surratt as payment for getting the remaining Montreal money, US$650,000, couriered safely to France or England.

General Gabriel Rains of the Confederate Naval Ordnance Bureau received a message the same day to send a demolitions expert to Virginia to meet with Mosby for insertion into DC. Harney was dispatched towards Richmond, based on his work as a "torpedo planter" working on the CSS Hunley, but on April 2, 1865, the city was evacuated. Mosby, Slater and Surratt were among those scattering—Harney took a train to Gordonsville where he is believed to have met Major Cornelius Boyle to pass a further message to Mosby. Boyle then gave Harney a horse and a guide believed to be Thomas Franklin Summers, who would help him reach Washington, DC. During those same days, Mosby sent his friend Capt. Robert S. Walker to meet with Boyle "to learn the true state of affairs".

Beverly Kennon was tasked with placing Type 5 swaying torpedoes, as sea mines strategically in the Potomac River to hinder any pursuing forces following any success by Harney or Booth's teams.
