= 2nd Missouri Infantry Regiment (Confederate) =

Infantry regiment of the Confederate States Army

- Active: January 16, 1862 to October 1, 1863
- Allegiance: Confederate States of America
- Branch: Confederate States Army
- Type: Infantry
- Engagements: American Civil War: Battle of Pea Ridge; Battle of Farmington, Mississippi; Second Battle of Corinth; Battle of Champion Hill; Battle of Big Black River Bridge; Siege of Vicksburg

The 2nd Missouri Infantry Regiment was an infantry regiment that served in the Confederate States Army during the American Civil War. Organized on January 16, 1862, the regiment first saw major action at the Battle of Pea Ridge on March 7 and 8, 1862. After Pea Ridge, the regiment was transferred across the Mississippi River, fighting in the Battle of Farmington, Mississippi on May 9. The unit missed the Battle of Iuka in September, but was heavily engaged at the Second Battle of Corinth on October 3 and 4. The regiment helped drive in a Union position on October 3. On October 4, the 2nd Missouri Infantry, along with the rest of Colonel Elijah Gates' brigade, captured a fortification known as Battery Powell, but were forced to retreat by Union reinforcements.

On May 16, 1863, the regiment was part of a major attack at the Battle of Champion Hill. The attack was repulsed, and the regiment was routed at the Battle of Big Black River Bridge the next day. During the Siege of Vicksburg, the regiment helped repulse Union assaults on May 19 and May 22. On July 1, a mine was detonated under the regiment's position; the regiment's commander was killed during the ensuing fighting. After the Confederate garrison of Vicksburg surrendered on July 4, the men of the 2nd Missouri Infantry were paroled and exchanged. On October 1, 1863, the regiment was combined with the 6th Missouri Infantry Regiment to form the 2nd and 6th Missouri Infantry Regiment (Consolidated). The new regiment saw action during the Atlanta campaign and the Battle of Allatoona in 1864. On November 30, 1864, the combined regiment suffered devastating losses at the Battle of Franklin. The 2nd and 6th Missouri Infantry (Consolidated) surrendered at the Battle of Fort Blakeley on April 9, 1865.

== Organization ==
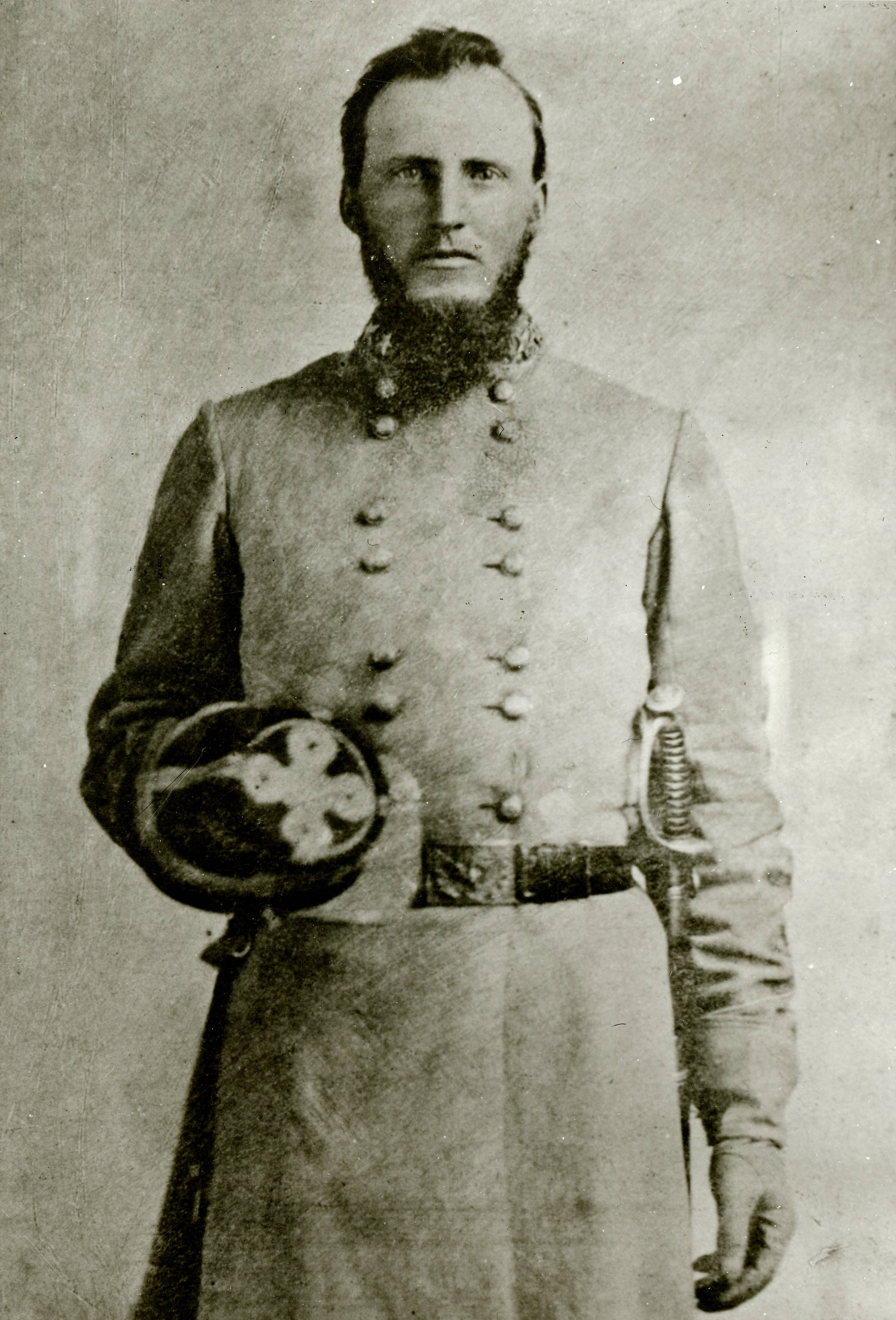
Wartime photograph of Francis M. Cockrell

The 2nd Missouri Infantry Regiment was organized and joined the Confederate States Army on January 16, 1862, while stationed at Springfield, Missouri. Many of the men in the regiment had seen prior service in the secessionist Missouri State Guard. When the regiment was first organized, it was given the designation of 1st Missouri Infantry Regiment, but this was changed to 2nd Missouri Infantry Regiment, as another regiment had precedence to the former name. At the time of organization, the regiment was commanded by Colonel John Quincy Burbridge. Edward B. Hull was the regiment's first lieutenant colonel, and Robert D. A. Dwyer was the regiment's first major. At the time of organization, the regiment contained ten companies, designated with the letters A–I and K, all of which contained men from Missouri.

== Service history ==
=== 1862 ===
==== Pea Ridge ====
Less than a month after the regiment was organized, the Confederates abandoned Springfield. During the ensuing retreat into Arkansas, the 2nd Missouri Infantry served as a rear guard unit. At the Battle of Pea Ridge on March 7 and 8, the regiment was part of Colonel Lewis Henry Little's First Missouri Brigade, along with the 3rd Missouri Infantry Regiment, 1st Missouri Cavalry Regiment, Wade's Missouri Battery, and Clark's Missouri Battery. In the early stages of the battle, the 2nd Missouri Infantry was deployed in a ravine when Major General Sterling Price's Confederate division, of which Little's brigade was a part, encountered Union forces along the approach to a local landmark named Elkhorn Tavern. The 2nd Missouri Infantry was later engaged in a Confederate attack against a Union line arrayed around the tavern. The charge eventually broke the Union line, and the 2nd Missouri Infantry helped capture a portion of the 3rd Iowa Battery, despite taking heavy casualties from canister fire. However, the Confederate ranks quickly became disorganized, hindering their ability to follow up on gains from the assault. On March 8, the regiment was initially positioned in an open field, but heavy Union artillery fire forced the regiment to retreat to the cover of some woods. Union troops then pressed a counterattack, forcing the 2nd Missouri Infantry, as well as the rest of Price's division, to retreat. Three companies of the regiment became separated from the rest of the unit in the retreat, and along with Good's Texas Battery and Guibor's Missouri Battery, helped to repulse a small Union cavalry charge, ending the Battle of Pea Ridge, which was a Confederate defeat. Specific casualty returns reported that the regiment lost 46 men killed, 49 wounded, and 15 missing, for a total of 110, although an overall return for the regiment reported 150 losses.

==== Second Corinth ====
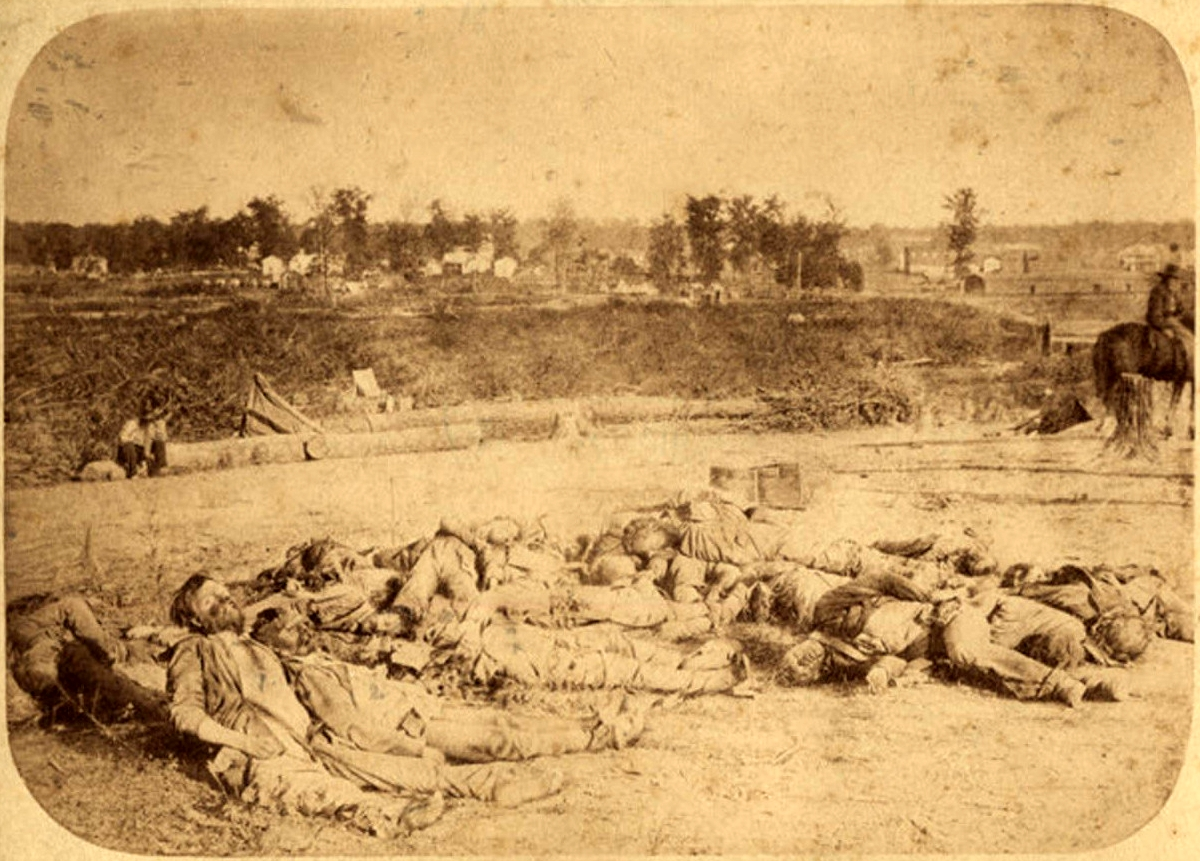
Confederate dead on the field at Second Corinth

After the defeat at Pea Ridge, the regiment retreated to the vicinity of Van Buren, Arkansas and was then ordered to Des Arc, Arkansas, on the other side of the state. On April 10, the regiment crossed the Mississippi River, moved to Memphis, Tennessee, and then reported to Corinth, Mississippi on April 28. A muster conducted in Corinth in early May found 923 men officially listed on the regiment's rolls, but only 590 of them were reported as present for duty. On May 9, the regiment participated in the Battle of Farmington, and left Corinth along with the rest of the Confederate army at the end of May. The 2nd Missouri Infantry then spent much of the rest of the summer stationed in northern Mississippi. Burbridge resigned on June 29 and was replaced by Lieutenant Colonel Francis M. Cockrell as commander of the regiment. On September 19, the regiment arrived on the field of the Battle of Iuka after the fighting ended.

At the Second Battle of Corinth on October 3 and 4, the 2nd Missouri Infantry was in Colonel Elijah Gates' brigade, along with the 16th Arkansas Infantry Regiment, 3rd Missouri Infantry Regiment, 5th Missouri Infantry Regiment, 1st Missouri Cavalry Regiment, and Wade's Missouri Battery. On October 3, the 2nd Missouri Infantry reinforced the brigade of Brigadier General Martin E. Green, and helped Green's brigade defeat a stubborn Union defensive position by enfilading the 11th Missouri Infantry Regiment. The next day, Gates' brigade, including the 2nd Missouri Infantry, charged the Union interior line. The attack was aimed for a fortification known as Battery Powell. The Confederate charge hit the division of Brigadier General Thomas A. Davies, breaking the Union line. The Confederate charge was also able to drive the Union artillerymen defending Battery Powell out of the fortification. The 2nd Missouri Infantry charged the 6th Wisconsin Battery, driving the battery's crews from the guns and taking the pieces. The Confederate charge had broken a large hole in the Union line. However, reinforcements were not sent to follow up the breakthrough, and a Union counterattack drove the 2nd Missouri Infantry and the rest of Gates' brigade from the ground they had won. At Second Corinth, the regiment lost 47 men killed, 107 wounded, and 91 missing, for a total of 245. The regiment then spent the next several months in camp.

=== 1863 ===
==== Champion Hill ====
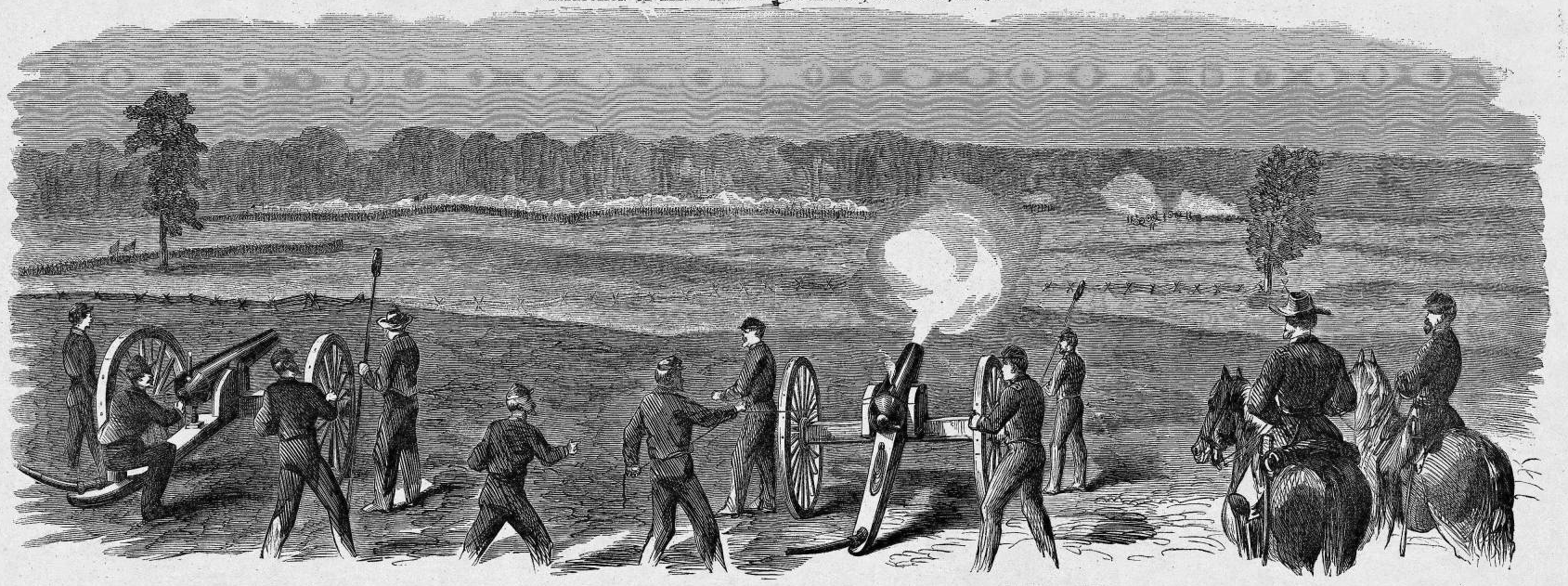
Battle of Champion Hill

In March 1863, the regiment was transferred to Grand Gulf, Mississippi, where the regiment built fortifications. The next month, the regiment was part of an observation force sent across the Mississippi River into Louisiana. After returning from Louisiana, the regiment was stationed at Grand Gulf, and did not participate in the Battle of Port Gibson on May 1. On May 3, the regiment was part of a rear guard that protected the Confederate retreat from Grand Gulf. At the Battle of Champion Hill on May 16, the 2nd Missouri Infantry, along with the rest of the First Missouri Brigade (now commanded by Cockrell) plugged a gap in the Confederate line. Later in the afternoon, Cockrell's brigade responded with a counterattack, driving Union troops back and recapturing the cannons of Waddell's Alabama Battery, which had been captured earlier in the fighting. The attackers suffered heavy casualties in the charge, one member of Cockrell's brigade later wrote that "blood ran in a stream, as water would have done." The charge gained momentum, eventually reaching the top of Champion Hill, a prominent landmark on the battlefield. Eventually, Union reinforcements arrived, blunting the Confederate charge and forcing the attackers to retreat. At Champion Hill, the 2nd Missouri Infantry suffered casualties of 10 men killed, 35 wounded, and 38 missing, for a total of 83.

==== Siege of Vicksburg ====
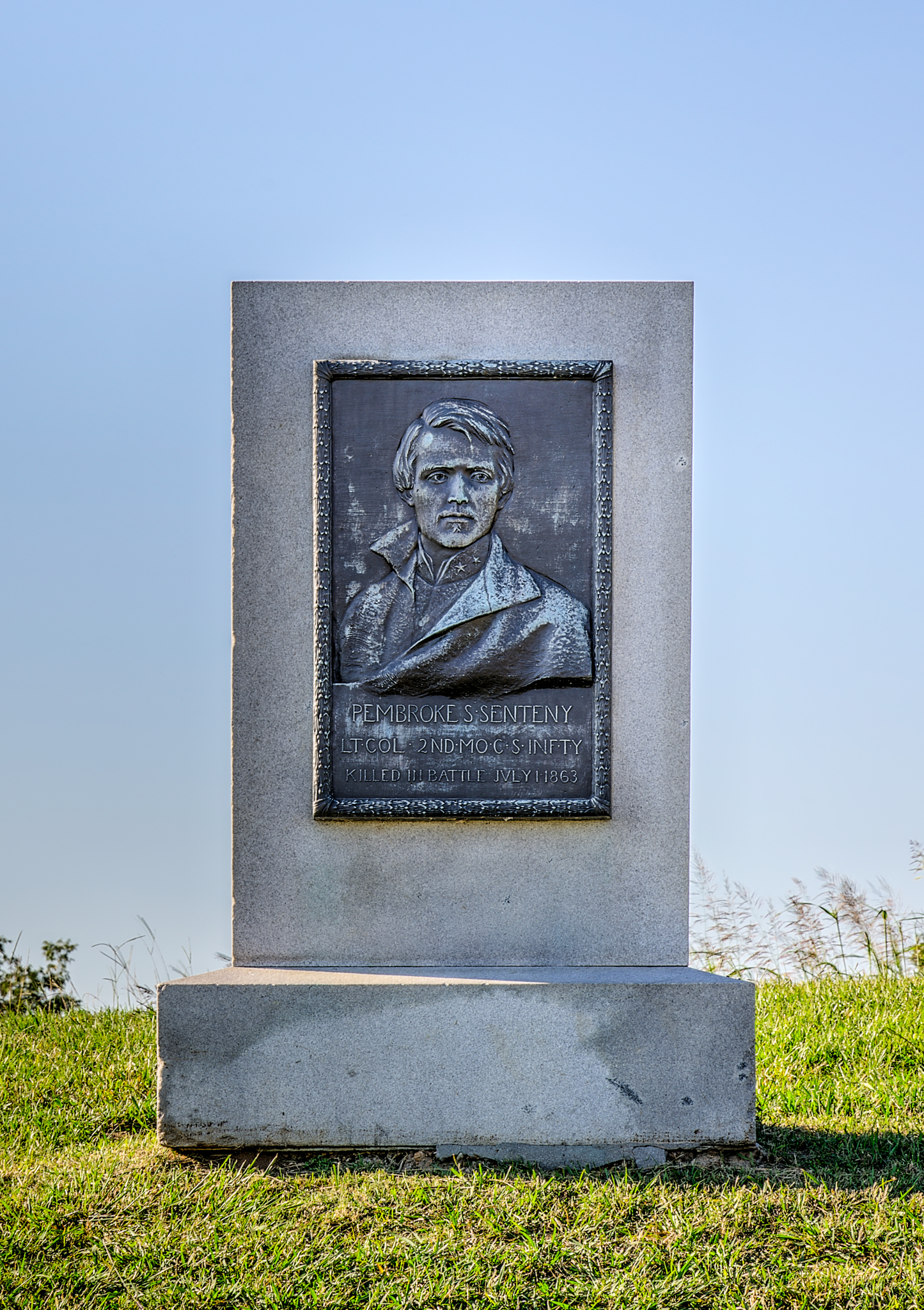
Relief portrait of Lt. Col. Pembroke Senteny at Vicksburg National Military Park

On May 17, the 2nd Missouri Infantry was part of a rear guard holding the crossing of the Big Black River in Mississippi. A Union attack broke through the Confederate line, forcing the 2nd Missouri Infantry and the rest of Cockrell's brigade to break for the rear. The 2nd Missouri Infantry routed, as did most of the Confederate regiments on the field. Cockrell's brigade then entered the defenses surrounding Vicksburg, Mississippi. During the Siege of Vicksburg, elements of the brigade were initially held as a reserve, but were eventually sent to various weak points in the line. On May 19, Union troops made a determined assault against the Confederate lines, and the 2nd Missouri Infantry was sent to a position known as the 27th Louisiana Lunette. The 2nd Missouri Infantry and the 27th Louisiana Infantry Regiment fought off Union attempts to carry the position. Later that day, a small group from the regiment burned a house lying between the lines to prevent Union troops from using it as cover. On May 22, the regiment again helped repulse a Union charge; several of the regiments the 2nd Missouri Infantry fought against on the 22nd were composed of Missourians fighting for the Union. The routine siege action also took a toll on the regiment; two men of the 2nd Missouri were killed by Union shellfire on June 26. A mine was detonated beneath the 2nd Missouri Infantry's position on July 1, inflicting multiple casualties. Cockrell led the regiment to the gap blown in the lines, shouting "Come on, Old Bloody Second Missouri; you have died once, and can die again!" The explosion was not followed with an infantry assault, although Union artillery did fire into the gap in the line. Lieutenant Colonel Pembroke Senteny had been commanding the regiment on July 1, and was fatally shot through the head. The 2nd Missouri Infantry suffered a total of 38 casualties on July 1.

On July 4, the Confederate garrison of Vicksburg surrendered. The men of the regiment were paroled, ordered to Demopolis, Alabama, and officially exchanged on September 12. By the July 4, only 356 men remained in the regiment. On October 1, regiment was combined with the 6th Missouri Infantry Regiment to form the 2nd and 6th Missouri Infantry Regiment (Consolidated); the 2nd Missouri Infantry ceased to exist as a separate unit.

== Commanders ==
Three men served as colonel of the 2nd Missouri Infantry: Burbridge, Cockrell, and Peter C. Flournoy, who was promoted to colonel on July 20. The regiment's lieutenant colonels were Hull, who resigned on May 8, 1862; Cockrell; Dwyer, who died on March 21, 1863; Senteny, and Thomas M. Carter. Dwyer, Senteny, Thomas M. Carter, and William F. Carter served as the regiment's majors.

== Legacy ==
The 2nd and 6th Missouri Infantry (Consolidated) was commanded by Colonel Flournoy, formerly of the 2nd Missouri Infantry. Companies A, E, F, G, I, and K of the 2nd and 6th Missouri (Consolidated) were from the 2nd Missouri Infantry, and Companies B, C, D, and H were from the 6th Missouri. The new regiment fought in the Atlanta campaign in 1864, including at the Battle of Kennesaw Mountain on June 27. On October 5, the regiment was part of a Confederate force that assaulted a Union outpost at the Battle of Allatoona. The regiment then fought at the Battle of Franklin on November 30, where the regiment lost its flag to capture and suffered over 60 percent casualties. After missing the Battle of Nashville in mid-December, the regiment was transferred to Mississippi in January 1865. After being sent to Mobile, Alabama in March, the regiment was captured at the Battle of Fort Blakeley on April 9, ending the regiment's fighting tenure.

== Sources ==
- Cozzens, Peter (1997). The Darkest Days of the War: The Battles of Iuka and Corinth. Chapel Hill, North Carolina: University of North Carolina Press. ISBN 0-8078-2320-1.
- McGhee, James E. (2008). Guide to Missouri Confederate Regiments, 1861–1865. Fayetteville, Arkansas: University of Arkansas Press. ISBN 978-1-55728-870-7.
- Shea, William L.; Hess, Earl J. (1992). Pea Ridge: Civil War Campaign in the West. Chapel Hill, North Carolina: University of North Carolina Press. ISBN 0-8078-4669-4.
- Tucker, Phillip Thomas (1993). The South's Finest: The First Missouri Confederate Brigade From Pea Ridge to Vicksburg. Shippensburg, Pennsylvania: White Mane Publishing Co. ISBN 0-942597-31-1.
