= 5th Arkansas Field Battery =

- Active: 1862–1865
- Country: Confederate States of America
- Allegiance: CSA
- Branch: Artillery
- Size: Battery
- Nickname: Memphis Appeal Battery
- Engagements: American Civil War: Battle of Corinth; Battle of Hatchie's Bridge; Siege of Vicksburg

Commanders
- 1862: Captain William C. Bryan
- 1862–1863: Captain William N. Hogg
- 1863–1865: Captain Christopher C. Scott

The 5th Arkansas Field Battery (1862–1865) was a Confederate Army artillery battery during the American Civil War. The unit was originally referred to as the 'Appeal Artillery or the Memphis Appeal Battery. Battlefield markers at the National Vicksburg Military Park describe the unit as Appeal (Arkansas) Battery. The unit served east of the Mississippi River until it surrendered at the end of the Vicksburg Campaign. After being exchanged, the battery re-organized and served the remainder of the war in the Department of the Trans-Mississippi.

== Organization ==
The Appeal Artillery was organized at Memphis, Tennessee, on March 7, 1862, under the command of Captain William C. Bryan. Many of the original members came from Ouachita County, Arkansas, but apparently ten members, half the employees, of the staff of the Appeal newspaper (the Commercial Appeal today), joined the battery. The unit was outfitted by the proprietors of the Memphis Appeal, who had strong connections to Camden in Ouachita County. It is unclear if this outfitting of the battery included the guns themselves. General M. Jeff. Thompson's order-book indicates that the battery's first guns were obtained from a disbanded Missouri State Guard unit. Other sources indicated that the unit was issued four cannons in Memphis: two 3-inch (7.6 cm) Iron Ordnance rifles and two 12-pound (5.4 kg) bronze field howitzers. These may have come from the Quinby & Robinson Company of Memphis, Tennessee.

On May 6, Captain Bryan and his Appeal Battery were ready. That night, amid tremendous enthusiasm of Memphis citizens, the battery departed from the old Memphis & Charleston Railway depot for Corinth, Mississippi, where the Confederate Army was re-organizing following its defeat at Shiloh the month before. A silken flag was presented to the departing battery by a hoop-skirted young woman whom The Appeal's reporter described as, "the lady of Dr. Keller." She made the presentation speech in the flowery language of her time.

"Captain Bryan," she said, "It is with no ordinary feelings and, I may add, on no ordinary occasion, that I present through you to the Appeal Battery this beautiful flag.

"The foe insults our native land and proudly apes the conqueror and you, with your gallant boys, go forth to defend her. I can proudly say, no company, no regiment, in the service has more gallant officers and no men will prove more daring.

"Confident that you will make The Appeal Battery the terror of the invading vandals, to your arms I bequeath this battle flag with these words;

Oh, genius of this happy land,
Descend and bless this chosen band,
Give to them to meet their daring foe,
Then Liberty shall nerve their blow.

Captain Bryan accepted the silken flag. His speech of acceptance has been lost to history, but The Memphis Appeal's reporter assures readers that "he responded in spirited and appropriate terms, and his men received the flag with three hearty cheers for the amiable donor." Several of the men, so the story added, "made earnest appeals to Captain Bryan that to them might be committed the honor of carrying the flag in the fight."

The battery officers included: Captain W. C. Bryan; Lieutenant (later Captain) William N. Hogg; Lieutenant (later Captain) Christopher C. Scott; Second Lieutenant Robert S. Walker. Under Captain Hogg's command: Lieutenant Christopher C. Scott; Second Lieutenant Robert S. Walker; Second Lieutenant R. N. Cotton. Under Captain Scott's command: Lieutenant R. N. Cotton; Lieutenant E. W. Lightfoot.

== Service ==
The battery was initially assigned to the support of Rust's (later Dockery's and Cabell's) brigade in Maury's division of the Army of the West, camped at that time around Corinth, Mississippi.

The battery supported Colonel William L. Cabell's brigade of Brigadier General Dabney H. Muary's Division of Major General Sterling Price's Corps of Major General Earl Van Dorn's Army of the West throughout the Corinth campaign in the summer of 1862. The unit fought at the battle of Corinth on October 3–4, 1862. The unit sustained three killed and three wounded in the conflicts at Corinth and the Battle of Hatchie's Bridge. Lieutenant Hog, who commanded the Appeal Battery during the Battle of Hatchie's Bridge, and his men were specifically cited by Brigadier General Cabel for "especial notice for the skill and efficiency with which they handled the battery and pours shell and grape into the enemy's ranks".

In November 1862, the battery was reassigned to support Hébert's brigade in Forney's division in Department of Mississippi and East Louisiana, where it served during the Vicksburg campaign in the early summer of 1863, and was assigned to the Vicksburg defenses during the 47-day siege of that city in May–July, 1863. The unit apparently had a hard time keeping control of its own guns during the siege of Vicksburg:

In Trenches, July 2nd, 1863.

Maj. Memminger, A.A. Genl. Dept.

On May 19th a howitzer of the Appeal Battery was ordered from Gen'l Hebert's line on the left of the Jackson Road to take position in Gen'l Shoup's lines. The officer in charge of the gun was killed as he was putting the gun in position & Gen'l Shoup placed the gun in charge of Lieut. Herren of Wade's Battery. A few days since Lt. Herren gave the detachment belonging to the gun a six days leave of absence. Upon their going back to report to their gun & draw their rations, they were informed by a lieutenant of McNally's Battery, who had succeeded Lieut. Herren in command of the gun, Lieut. Herren being wounded, that they were relieved & that his men had charge of the gun.

Again, on last Wednesday a 3-in. rifle gun also belonging to the Appeal Battery was ordered to take position on Col. Dockery's line. I sent the gun over that night. My men succeeded in getting it in position by morning & when the sergeant in charge of the gun reported to Col. Dockery to receive instructions, Col. Dockery ordered him to camp, informed him that some of the men of his brigade would man the gun. I have thus had 2 of my detachments relieved from duty on their own guns & men who had lost their guns in previous battles assigned to them instead. I would therefore, Major, respectfully protest against since unjust treatment of my men. They have fully proven themselves competent to use a gun & have always nobly performed their duty whenever called upon & they as well as the officers feel very sensibly the imputation that such treatment insinuates. Hoping then, Major, that my men will be allowed to take charge of their own guns again, I am

Your very obt. servt.,

R. COTTEN,

Lieut. Comdg. Appeal Battery.

A detachment of the battery, under Lieutenant Christopher C. Scott, served one 3-inch rifle in the position known as the Third Louisiana Redan, from May 18, 1863, until the surrender, July 4, 1863. The battery's casualties during the siege included four killed five wounded. On May 19, 1863, Captain Hogg was severely wounded, and Lieutenant Walker was killed. A corporal and four privates were also killed or wounded in that incident. Captain Hogg died of his wounds on May 28, 1863. Christopher C. Scott wounded on duty in the Third Louisiana Redan June 25, 1863.

The battery was surrendered with the Vicksburg garrison on July 4, 1863. General Ulysses S. Grant initially demanded the conditional surrender of the Vicksburg garrison, but faced with the necessity of feeding 30,000 starving Confederates and having the idea that these soldiers might do more harm to the Confederate cause by being released to return home rather than being exchanged as whole units, he relented and allowed for the immediate parole of the unit. According to the Confederate War Department, the Union leader encouraged the surrendered Confederates to simply return home, rather than being officially paroled and exchanged. The able bodied Confederate soldiers who were released on parole walked out of Vicksburg (they were not allowed to proceed in any military formations) on July 11, 1863. Paroling of these able bodied men was completed in their respective camps inside Vicksburg prior to July 11. Those who were wounded or sick in the various hospitals in Vicksburg were paroled, and were released, as soon as they could leave on their own. July 15/16 is the most common date of these Vicksburg hospital paroles. Some of the most seriously wounded and sick were sent by steamship down the Mississippi River and over to Mobile, Alabama, where they were delivered on parole to Confederate authorities.

Confederate commanders designated Enterprise, Mississippi, as the rendezvous point (parole camp) for the Vicksburg parolees to report to after they got clear of the last Federal control point at Big Black Bridge. Most of the Arkansas units, including many survivors of the Appeal Battery, appear to have bypassed the established parole camps, and possibly with the support, or at least by the compliancy, of their Union captors, simply crossed the river and returned home. Because so many of the Vicksburg parolees, especially from Arkansas, simply went home, Major General Pemberton requested Confederate President Davis grant the men a thirty to sixty-day furlough. The furloughs were not strictly adhered to so long as the soldier eventually showed up at a parole camp to be declared exchanged and returned to duty. Those who went directly home were treated as if they had been home on furlough if they eventually reported into one of these two parole centers. The exchange declaration reports issued by Colonel Robert Ould in Richmond for various units in the Vicksburg and Port Hudson surrenders began in September 1863 based upon men who actually reported to one of the two parole camps. Pemberton eventually coordinated with the Confederate War Department and Confederate General Kirby Smith, commanding the Department of the Trans-Mississippi, to have the Arkansas Vicksburg parolee's rendezvous point established at Camden, Arkansas.

Apparently Captain Scott and eight members of the battery did report to the exchange camp, but since most of the battery members had crossed the Mississippi River and returned to Arkansas, they were left without a unit.

Appeal Battery, Mackall's Brig.,

Near Enterprise, Miss., January 3, 1864.

Maj. S. Croom, A.A. Genl.

Major—I have the honor to make application to be ordered to the Trans-Miss. Department.

My reasons for desiring this may be seen from the following statement. A majority of the [The page is badly torn at its two folds, obliterating about three lines of text.] are from Arkansas and at the surrender of Vicksburg, these men crossed the Miss. River. My Lieutenants also (Cotton & Lightfoot) are in that Dept. By a letter from Lieut. Cotton I am informed that he has been ordered to report with the men to Brig. Genl. Dockery, Comd'g Par. & Exch. Pris. from Vicksburg & Port Hudson. Lieut. C. has obtained about 25 recruits which together with those who left from this Dept. will make near sixty men altogether which he has. He was in camp at Washington, Arkansas, when he wrote.

Eight men only have reported to this camp to me and [letter torn] them five or six who are in Mississippi. I cannot recruit my Battery in this State. That it is impracticable to bring those men back across the Miss. River you are well aware.

I respy ask your earliest attention to this application as the rising of the river will soon preclude all crossing.

I have the honor to be, Major, very respy yr obt servt,

C. C. SCOTT,

Capt. Appeal Battery.

Captain Scott was apparently successful in being transferred back across the river. The battery was declared to be exchanged as of December 20, 1863. The battery was reorganized and re-equipped by the survivors who returned to Arkansas, with four guns and Captain Christopher C. Scott assumed command. In early April, 1864, when word came of Union Major General Frederick Steele's advance toward Camden, Arkansas, as part of the Arkansas phase of the Red River Campaign, the battery was stationed at Lewisville, Arkansas, without guns. The unit had apparently been armed but had given up its guns and was awaiting arrival of replacements. While some member of the unit attached themselves to other commander during the campaign, the battery apparently played no organized roll in the Camden Expedition.

The remnants of the battery stranded on the east side of the Mississippi River were apparently still seeking to be reassigned to a unit a year later when this letter was written:

Camp Co. B, 1st Battln. Ex. Pri.,

Meridian, Miss., July 5, 1864.

Maj. J. L. Wofford, Chief of Artillery.

Major—The undersigned, having been exchanged under the recent order of Col. Ould, Comis'r of Exchange, are desirous of being transferred to the Hudson Battery, now on duty with Genl Forrest's command.

We belong to the Appeal Battery. This Battery will never be reorganized. When the garrison of Vicksburg had surrendered, most of the men of this Battery crossed over the river, only eleven reporting at Enterprise. Capt. Scott, comdg. the Battery, transferred the most of them to other batteries, so that now there only five left. Under existing circumstances, we prefer being transferred to the Hudson Battery, and respectfully request that our choice may be approved and that we may be immediately transferred as above indicated, provided that the good of the service will not suffer thereby.

Very Respectfully, Your Obt. Svt.,

1st Sergt. J. M. SACKETT.
Sergt. J. D. MONTGOMERY.
Bugler W. H. MONTGOMERY.

In the late summer of 1864, the battery was re-equipped with two 12-pounder howitzers and two 6-pounder smoothbores. The battery was designated as the Fifth Arkansas Field Battery on November 19, 1864. On December 31, 1864, General Edmund Kirby Smith listed the battery as belonging to Blocher's Artillery Battalion of Acting Major General Churchill's First Infantry Division of Major General John B. Magruder's Second Army Corps, Army of the Trans-Mississippi.

The battery participated in the following engagements:

Second Battle of Corinth, Mississippi October 3–4, 1862.
Battle of Hatchie's Bridge, Mississippi, 1863
Siege of Vicksburg, May 18 to July 4, 1863.

== Surrender ==
When news of the surrender, first of General Robert E. Lee's army and two weeks late the surrender of General Joseph E. Johnston's army reached the Army of the Trans-Mississippi, the Appeal Battery, now known as the 5th Arkansas Field Battery, was encamped around Marshall, Texas, where the Army had been moved due to a general lack of forage in Arkansas. The battery which, along with four others belonged to an artillery battalion under the command of Major McMahan from Galveston, Texas, was camped on the south side of the town, with the infantry units camped on the north side of town. Upon news of the surrender, the units simply disbanded and returned home rather than await a formal surrender. This led to the battalion's guns being abandoned outside of town and the battery equipment being looted by local civilians and all of the government horses being taken by former soldiers. The battery was formally surrendered with General Kirby Smith's army on May 26, 1865. The date of the military convention between Confederate General Kirby Smith and Union General Edward Canby for the surrender of the troops and public property in the Trans-Mississippi Department was May 26, 1865, however, it took a while for parole commissioners to be appointed and for public property to be accounted for. As a result, a final report of field artillery which was part of the accounting process, was not completed until June 1, 1865. According to the final accounting, at the time of the surrender, the battery was armed with two 12-pounder field howitzers and two 6-pounder guns. In the final report, the Captain C.C. Scott is listed as the commander and the unit was located at Marshall, Texas.

== See also ==
- List of Confederate units from Arkansas
- Confederate Units by State
