= Cornelius Boyle =

Confederate States Army officer

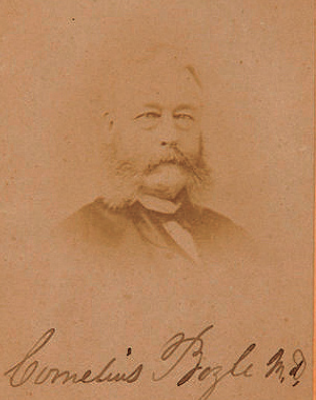

Cornelius Boyle (1817–1878) was an American medical doctor from Washington, D.C., who attained the rank of Major in the Confederate Army during the US Civil War. Boyle was "trusted at the highest levels in the Confederate Army, and played some special role in the conduct of clandestine operations".

Due to his role in founding the Knights of the Golden Circle, and control of what amounted to a clandestine "Intelligence Center" during the war, he was named in conspiracies surrounding the assassination of Abraham Lincoln and Thomas F. Harney's April 1865 effort to bomb the White House. Historian Trish Kaufmann later commented it seemed he lived his entire life "in a whirlwind".

== Pre-war ==
Given his father's stature in Andrew Jackson's administration, it was noted that "by the time Cornelius grew up, there was money, position, glory - still he wasn't an idle person...an intensely proud man".

Educated at McLeod's Academy and obtaining his 1844 doctorate from Columbian College, Boyle operated a DC medical practice, popular among the political elite due to his United Irishmen father John Boyle's position as Chief Clerk and Acting Secretary of the US Navy. Upon his father's death, Cornelius Boyle successfully sued the United States for the salary it had failed to pay John Boyle commiserate with his role as Acting Secretary of the Navy.

Noted for his limp, Boyle treated senator Charles Sumner after he was caned on the senate floor in 1856, and treated President Madison's aged step-son Payne Todd for many years, being gifted the crystal flute of President Madison, likely as payment for his years of medical care.

In the years prior to the outbreak of war, Boyle served was noted as a "chief of good fellows and genial gentlemen" and served as director of the "Jackson Democratic Association" in 1860. Boyle was one of the managers of the Feb 22 1861 Military and Civic Birthright Ball, at the Washington Assembly Rooms.

When William Byrne, a clandestine member of the KGC from Baltimore, (Note: Byrne kept his KGC membership quiet, but spoke about it in correspondence with Boyle) founded the National Volunteers group - Boyle was quick to assemble a similar group dubbed National Volunteers in DC - about which he was questioned by a congressional committee on Feb 1 1861 since their mandate, which he acknowledged writing himself, stated "we will stand by and defend the south", to which Boyle answered simply that it was a social club fond of marching. At one point Boyle approached Col. Charles P. Stone to ask for arms to distribute among his men, leading Stone to ask for a muster roll proving at least 100 men; when Boyle provided the list, Stone simply seized it as intelligence.

On February 20, 1861, the Virginia's General Assembly passed an act to amend the 1854 act approving James French's plans to construct an Orange and Alexandria Railroad line between Alexandria and DC - now naming Cornelius Boyle alongside the Frenches, Edgar Snowden, RW Latham John W. Maury as those to fulfill the plan.

== Civil War service ==
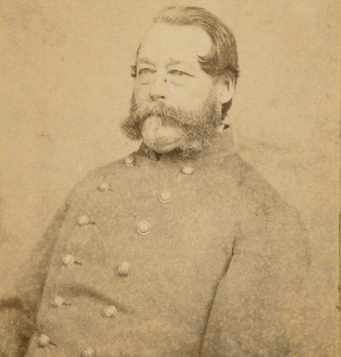
Photo of Major Cornelius Boyle, during the war

When war broke out two months later, Boyle and the National Volunteers marched into Alexandria, Virginia to join the Confederate cause. Boyle brought his men on April 22, and was named a "Captain" and ordered to bring the men to Culpeper, Virginia where they arrived April 28. By May 6 Boyle had been granted a commission of Major, a rank he then held throughout the war. Initially under the command of Beauregard, Boyle was operating from a "small white cottage" next to the medical office in Camp Pickens near Manassas, where Lt. Col. George W. Lay wrote of Boyle's "peculiar duties at Manassas".

In 1862, Gen. Robert E. Lee ordered Boyle to take command as Provost Marshal of the position at Gordonsville, Virginia where he would remain. Boyle was believed to have quickly fallen into espionage, given the railroad's passage through Gordonsville enabling messages in and out of DC, and his connections with people such as Rose O'Neal Greenhow. Boyle applied for a promotion on Aug 2 1862, but was denied. When Gen. A. R. Lawton tried to second Boyle to his Quartermastering duties, Gnl Lee wrote back that "Major Boyle was commissioned specially for the service on which he is now engaged. I know of no one who can take his place".

In August 1862, a young nephew of Boyle's fled DC and took up with his uncle in Gordonsville briefly.

On March 12, 1863, Lee ordered Gnl Joseph E. Johnston to build such structures as would help Boyle's men defend Gordonsville from possible cavalry charge. Lt. Charles R. Jones of the 55th NC Infantry and Capt. H.A. Chambers had served as Boyle's clerks, until the former was appointed Asst Provost Marshal at Petersburg, Virginia himself - before retiring to Tennessee as a newspaper editor. Boyle remained in charge of triaging and forwarding prisoners-of-war.

On July 24, 1863, Judge Wylie ordered the confiscation of the property of a number of "rebel enemies", naming Boyle alongside John A. Campbell, Lavinia Boyle and others. In the final days of the war, General Jubal Early borrowed a pair of pistols from Boyle as they fled the Shenandoah Valley. Boyle's wife, Fanny Greene, was also related to famed spy Thomas Greene whose two sons were in Mosby's Rangers - and at the time of her arrest she was carrying mail to be distribute to southern supporters.

=== Boyle and Mosby's role in final actions ===
Historians have often speculated about the bizarre Conclusion of the American Civil War, in that surrender appeared unintentionally delayed by the Confederates long after their army had been overcome and stood no chance of returning to the battlefield. One dominant theory is that the delay was simply to allow time for the Confederate Secret Service and specific individuals such as Mosby and Boyle to carry out spectacular reprisal actions such as the assassination of Lincoln.

On March 27, 1865, Boyle had been the relay for W. H. Taylor to pass orders to Mosby that he was to collect his men and take command of the entire section between Boyle's Gordonsville, to Blue Ridge, and the Valley - and to withdraw any forces possibly remaining in Northern Neck. Meanwhile, Thomas F. Harney had been called to Richmond, from his work as a "torpedo planter" working on the CSS Hunley and later developments. One day before Richmond was scheduled to be evacuated, on April 1, 1865, President Davis approved the release of $1500 in gold from the Confederate Secret Service - $200 was given to Surratt, and the rest seemingly was split between Mosby and Harney.

On April 2, 1865, Richmond was evacuated. Mosby, Sarah Slater from Montreal and John Surratt were among those scattering - Harney took a train to Gordonsville where he is believed to have met Boyle to pass a further message to Mosby. Boyle then gave Harney a horse and a guide believed to be Thomas Franklin Summers - who would help him bring his explosive payload to the White House. During those same days, Mosby sent his personal friend Capt Robert S. Walker to meet with Boyle "to learn the true state of affairs".

During his 12-day flight after assassinating Lincoln, John Wilkes Booth told Confederate Signal Corps officer William Rollins (Note: The Confederate Signals Corp was headed by a member of Boyle's DC National Volunteers well-known to him) that his intention was to escape, presumably with the assistance of Mosby's Rangers, to the Orange County Courthouse near Boyle's encampment at Gordonsville.

Those investigating the assassination came into possession of a letter dated April 10, four days before the assassination, appearing to have been written by a leader in the contemporary form of the Knights of the Golden Circle, although it was postmarked some weeks after the assassination. It was addressed to Dr. Cornelius Boyle, John Surratt, Mary Surratt and seemingly George Atzerodt stating, "You're to attempt the murder of Secretary Seward, while I am to attempt for the life of Mr. Chase and if we succeed in getting away we are all bound for Canada". While it was Lewis Powell, of the Confederate Secret Service and Mosby's Rangers, who stabbed Seward, reports by War Department investigator Lt. David D. Dana initially named a separate bushwhacker, Capt. John H. Boyle, as the attacker - and Atzerodt testified on May 1 that "[John H.] Boyle also killed Capt. Watkins near Annapolis last month, was one of the party, in the conspiracy". The three addressees of the letter other than Dr. Cornelius Boyle were all sentenced to hang for conspiracy of the murder of Lincoln.

== Post-war ==
=== Mexico ===
I believe the Major to be utterly, thoroughly, completely, disgusted with the entire condition of affairs in this country and that he thinks that matters will grow worse instead of better. I believe he will never be a happy or content man so long as he remains in it and under those circumstances if he desires to leave the country and thinks he would be better satisfied and that it would be better for the children that he should do so, I am willing to go.

— Fanny Boyle, to her sister, February 23, 1866.

After the war, Boyle requested and was sent an Oath of Amnesty on August 14, 1865, but it was never deposited with the government; Boyle preferred to travel to Mexico to assist many among the Confederate veterans and Knights of the Golden Circle with mapping out their plans for an alternate resolution with a confederacy running through Central America and the Caribbean, at the same time General Early was also there.

He traveled there with Captain George M. Cayce, May Miles O'Bannon (daughter of Union Colonel Dixon Stansbury Miles and wife of CSA Major Laurens Willbrant O'Bannon), and wealthy landowner Eustace Barron, for whom he named his daughter. Their steamer, Vera Cruz, ran aground in North Carolina and Boyle was deemed instrumental in organising the safety of the passengers and return to New York to set off again on the steamship Manhattan. Boyle carried a letter of introduction for himself, to give to the former commander of the Confederate Navy, Matthew Fontaine Maury. Boyle wrote to his wife that William Quantrill was accompanying him, as a bodyguard of sorts, under the false name "Wilson" - one of several rumors that the notorious bushwhacker had survived his alleged death; one of five Confederate sympathizers he tasked with surveying and setting out the residential development.

While returning to Mexico with his wife in May 1867, Boyle's plan to settle 200 families in a "Barronville" plantation between the San Pedro River and Santiago River were abandoned following the execution of the Emperor Maximillian in 1867. Two months later Boyle's oath of amnesty, sent to him two years earlier, was deposited with the government and his pardon granted August 31. Boyle was nonetheless among the 34 key architects of the war named in the 1869 filing of Treason charges for the purposes of dismissal, alongside Davies, Lee, Ewell, Longstreet, Early, Breckinridge and others.

=== Return to the US ===
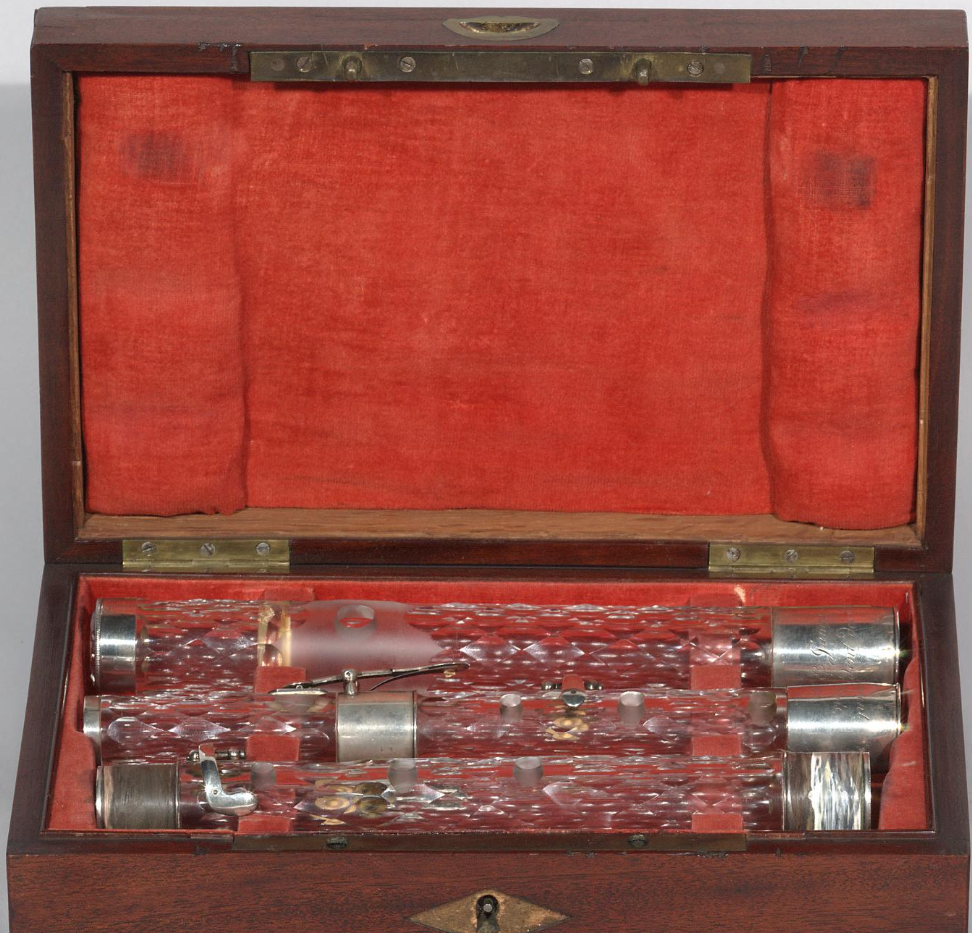
In 1903, Boyle's daughter FG Boyle arranged for the crystal flute crafted for James Madison, then owned by Boyle, to be put on display in the Smithsonian Museum, although it was subsequently purchased by Dr. Dayton C. Miller who gifted it to the Library of Congress. In 2022, the flute made headlines as it was played by pop musician Lizzo.

Returning to Virginia, Boyle took up running the White Silver Springs Spa in Fauquier, and in June 1868 invited the American Medical Association to hold their next convention on his property. His wife Fanny and infant child died in childbirth in 1869, less than a year after the birth of Eustacia. In the 1870 census, he listed himself as a musician holding $80,000 of real estate and $6,000 of personal objects. Boyle listed residents of his home including Thomas Atkins, who had drawn up the expansion draftwork for the Silver Springs Spa, as his "Clerk" and Martha Journey as his homekeeper, with a 10-year old Alice Courtney living alongside his own children. He also listed Robert Taliaferro and Davy Randolph as his black labourers. In Sept 1868, AH and Eliza Morehead filed a $35,000 lawsuit against Boyle for having enforced Gnl. Beauregard's prohibition on Eliza Morehead being allowed to cross and re-cross from DC into Virginia for three years during the war.

In 1871, following a petition signed by prominent physicians as well as Robert E. Lee, Boyle's DC property was eventually returned and he was permitted to re-enter the district. At some point he married Cherry Elizabeth Bethune, the daughter of Gen. James N. Bethune the man who owned and later held custody of the musician Blind Tom Wiggins, indeed one of Wiggins' songs was dedicated to Cherry. A fire engulfed the sulphur springs resort, and Eustacia later recalled how handsome her father had been holding her wrapped in a Chinese blanket on his knees during the fire. Boyle's relationship with Cherry Bethune was a stressor inside the home, as his eldest daughter resented the replacement of the family's matriarch - and Eustacia, then under 8 years old, was sent to live with maternal relatives.

Boyle died following an illness March 11, 1878 and was buried in an unmarked grave in Glenwood Cemetery, later marked and containing his first wife and several children. Cherry Bethune departed the family as she was disliked by the children, and left the two eldest teenaged Boyle children John and Frances to raise the younger children. The Exchange Hotel in Gordonsville listed the ghost of Major Boyle among its haunted attractions.
