= Lunsford L. Lomax =

Confederate States Army general (1835–1913)

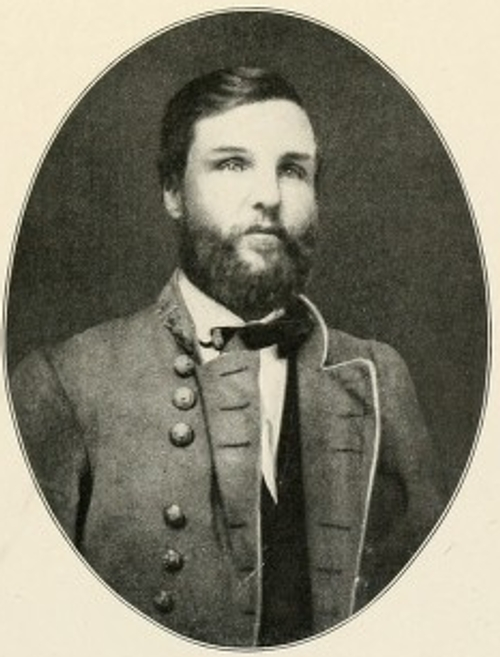
- Lunsford Lindsay Lomax

4th President of Virginia Agricultural and Mechanical College
- In office July 1, 1886 – July 1, 1891
- Preceded by: Thomas Nelson Conrad
- Succeeded by: John McLaren McBryde

Personal details
- Born: November 4, 1835 Newport, Rhode Island, U.S.
- Died: May 28, 1913 (aged 77) Washington, D.C., U.S.
- Resting place: Warrenton, Virginia

Military service
- Allegiance: United States of America; Confederate States of America
- Branch/service: United States Army; Confederate States Army
- Years of service: 1856–1861 (USA); 1861–1865 (CSA)
- Rank: Second Lieutenant (USA); Major General (CSA)
- Commands: 11th Virginia Cavalry; Valley District
- Battles/wars: American Civil War

Lunsford Lindsay Lomax (November 4, 1835 – May 28, 1913) was the fourth president of Virginia Agricultural and Mechanical College and an officer in the United States Army who resigned his commission to join the Confederate Army at the outbreak of the American Civil War. He had maintained a close friendship with his West Point classmate Fitzhugh Lee, and served under him as a brigadier in the Overland Campaign. He was then given command of the Valley District, where he supervised intelligence-gathering operations by Mosby's Rangers.

== Early and family life ==
Born in Newport, Rhode Island, on November 4, 1835, to the former Elizabeth Virginia Lindsay (1800-after 1860) and her husband, Major Mann Page Lomax (1787-1842), Lunsford Lomax was descended from the First Families of Virginia. His father was a career U.S. Army officer, specializing in artillery, who had served in New Orleans during the War of 1812, and married in 1820 during his leave in Norfolk, Virginia. He was named for his great grandfather, Lunsford Lomax (1705-1772) of "Portabago" plantation in Caroline County, who also served part-time in the Virginia House of Burgesses from 1742 until 1756 representing that county before the American Revolutionary War. His grandfather Thomas Lomax (1750-1835) served on the Caroline County Committee of Safety during the Revolutionary War and later in the Virginia House of Delegates. His father died of tuberculosis in Cambridge, Massachusetts, when Lomax was seven. His mother raised him and his five sisters in Norfolk, but by 1860 the Lomax womenfolk (his sisters remaining unmarried) had moved to Washington, D.C.

After a private education, Lomax received an "at-large" appointment to the United States Military Academy at West Point, New York. He graduated in 1856 with fellow Virginia classmate and friend Fitzhugh Lee.

Lunsford Lomax married Elizabeth Winter Payne (1850-1932), like him descended from the First Families of Virginia, on February 20, 1873, in Fauquier County, Virginia, and they would have daughters Elizabeth Lindsay Lomax Wood (1874–1951) and Anne Tayloe Lomax (1887–1961).

== U.S. Army career ==
Assigned to the prestigious 2nd Cavalry regiment, Lomax fought on the frontier and served in Bleeding Kansas during the years immediately preceding the conflict.

== American Civil War ==
Lomax resigned from the army in April 1861, and shortly thereafter accepted a captain's commission in the Virginia state militia. Initially assigned to Joseph E. Johnston's staff as assistant adjutant general, Lomax later served as inspector general for Benjamin McCulloch. Promoted to lieutenant colonel, he was transferred back to the Eastern Theater.

Appointed colonel of the 11th Virginia Cavalry in time for the Gettysburg campaign, Lomax was promoted to brigadier general after the battle. Lomax fought his brigade under the division command of his old classmate Fitzhugh Lee from Culpeper Courthouse through the Wilderness and around Petersburg. He was promoted to major general in August 1864 and was assigned to assist General Jubal Early in the Shenandoah Valley. After escaping capture at the Battle of Woodstock, Lomax was given command of the Valley District. When Richmond was evacuated, Lomax tried to join forces with John Echols's men at Lynchburg, Virginia, but unable to do so, Lomax finally surrendered with Joe Johnston in North Carolina.

Lesser known is Lomax's role in the formation of the partisan units that fought in Northern Virginia during the latter part of the War. In a statement made to Caroline Harper Long shortly before his death, published in the Baltimore Sun in 1920 by Beth Rhoades, entitled "Gray Ghost of the Confederacy," John Mosby writes:

General Lomax was with McCulloch in West Tennessee and after McCulloch was killed he was with Van Dorn. In the Fall of 1862 he was ordered to Richmond on a special mission. He was then detailed back to Van Dorn just before Christmas. He was a Lt. Colonel and placed in command of the 11th Virginia Cavalry. When Lomax was in Richmond he learned of his future transfer to Virginia. He had a scout sent up from Tennessee to assess the military information situation and to set up partisan scouts in the Shenandoah Valley. Up to that time everything in this area had been disorganized and difussed [sic] and relatively ineffective. Lomax wanted a scouting system identical with the very excellent system which existed in West Tennessee. He picked his men from amongst the scouts in West Tennessee and selected a man by the name of Boyd. He had been a railroad detective and he was among the best they had. He arrived in Richmond several days before Lomax left and Boyd proceeded on to Staunton where he was met by one of Winder's detectives by the name of Turner. Boyd recruited and trained some 35 to 40 men in Rockingham, Shenandoah and Augusta counties and formed them into the Linville Partisan Rangers. He taught them the fine points of scouting, telegraph line tapping, use of blasting powder, and all the other things a good scout needs to know. Boyd was one of Van Dorn's best scouts and did a fine job of setting up the partisans in the Valley.

Lomax had also arranged for me to begin independent operations in Loudoun County to the North. I got started about the first of the year. At that time I only had a few men, less than a dozen but we soon expanded and trained the men we had. We never were a large group nor were we designed to be a large fighting force. We had to form up and dissolve into the countryside in a few minutes. Secrecy was our greatest ally. We didn't drill like regulars and we had no permanent camps to provide that camp drudgery so disliked by regulars. We used dinner bells and whistles to signal with and to cause assembly. ...

In June of that year my outfit was designated the 43rd Battalion Partisan Rangers. But on his way back to Tennessee Boyd was captured and in fact did not get back to Tennessee before Lomax was transferred to Virginia. In February, after the capture of Boyd became known, the Linville Rangers were put under the command of Jake Cook but they were never officially recognized by the Confederate government and they were never paid. But they were active throughout the valley and they provided good information to Lomax.

Part of the opacity that surrounds Lomax's military career rests with him being the commanding officer of Mosby and the other partisan units in the Valley that brought information to General Lee and others. In fact, Mosby told Caroline Harper, an acquaintance who had been raised in the same aristocratic circles of Old Virginia, the illegitimate daughter of a prominent politician, that he had not felt he could even give the interview until Lomax's death, in order to protect him, for they were the closest of friends, both during and after the war.

== Postwar years ==
After Appomattox, Lomax farmed in Caroline and Fauquier counties for over 20 years. He was appointed president of the Virginia Agriculture and Mechanical College in 1886, serving until resigning in 1891. He continued contact with Jubal Early, and months after the death of former Confederate President Jefferson Davis, vehemently objected to his daughter Winnie's proposed marriage to Alfred Wilkinson, a New Yorker whose father had been an abolitionist.

Lomax later became a clerk in the War Department assembling and editing the Official Records of the war and was for a time commissioner of Gettysburg National Park.

== Death and legacy ==
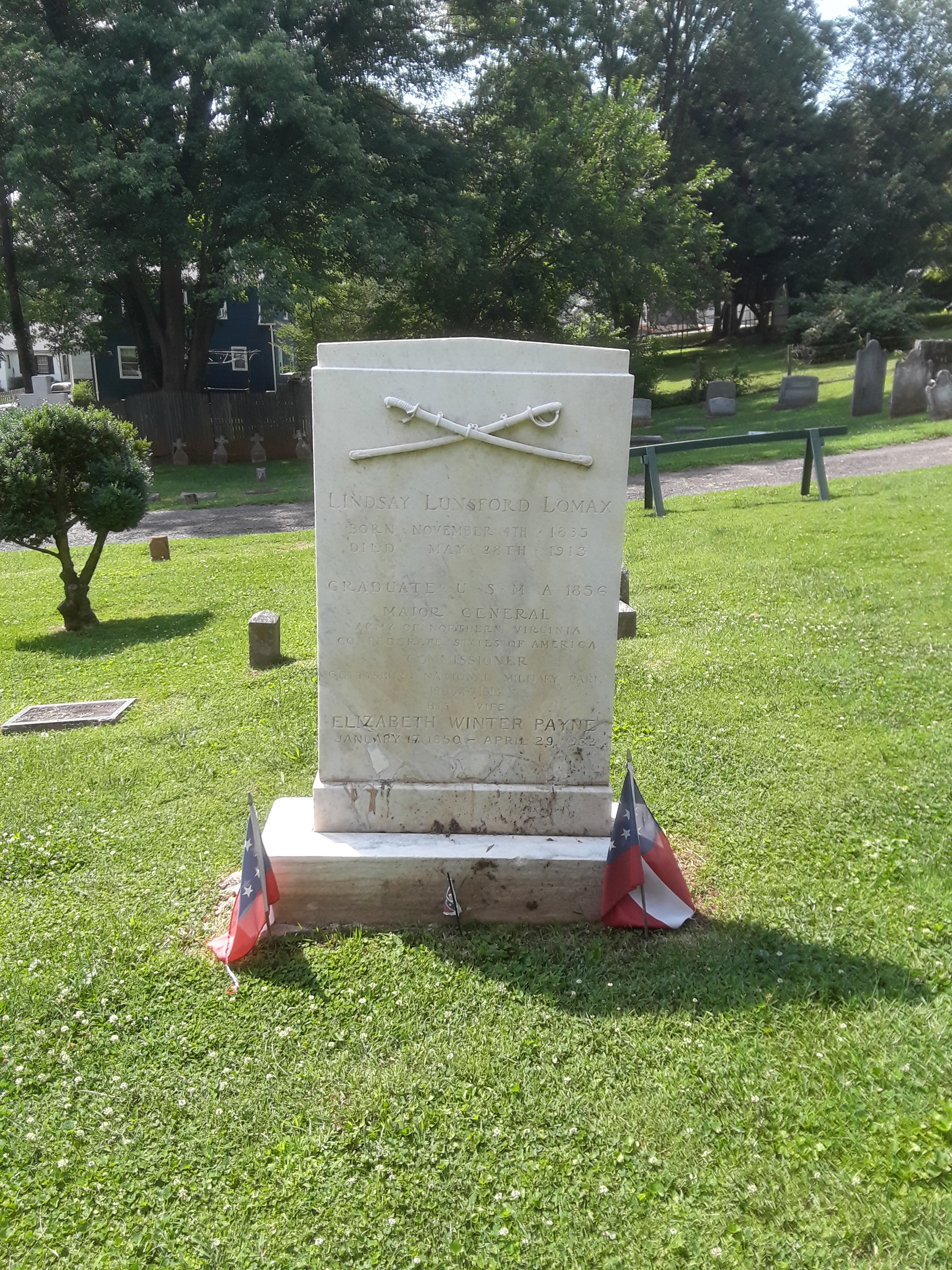
Lomax's grave in the Warrenton Cemetery

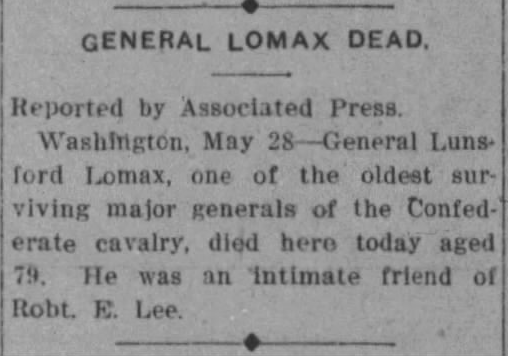
Death notice in the Marshall Messenger, 28 May 1913

Lomax died May 28, 1913, and was buried in Warrenton, Virginia.

== See also ==
- List of American Civil War generals (Confederate)
