= Trish Kaufmann =

American philatelist

- Born: Patricia A. Kaufmann; 1947 (age 77–78); Richmond, Virginia, US
- Years active: 1965–present
- Known for: Expert on postage stamps and postal history of the Confederate States of America
- Notable work: Editor-in-Chief, 2012 Confederate States of America Catalog and Handbook of Stamps and Postal History
- Board member of: Philatelic Foundation
- Spouse: Darryl Boyer

Patricia A. Kaufmann is an American philatelist, focusing on postage stamps and postal history of the Confederate States of America (CSA).

== Philately ==
Kaufmann has been collecting and studying Confederate philately since she was in her teens. She was an active exhibitor in the 1970s and 80, winning up to the Grand and Reserve Grand level in national competition.

Kaufmann has been involved in organized philately since 1969. She served on the board of the American Philatelic Research Library from 1983 to 1989, was president of the Confederate Stamp Alliance from 2008 to 2010, was elected to the Council of Philatelists of the Smithsonian National Postal Museum from 2011 to 2013 and served as chairman of the Board of Vice Presidents of the American Philatelic Society 2016–2022. She was elected to the Board of Trustees of the Philatelic Foundation in 2021.

Kaufmann served on the CSA Authentication Service from 1996 to 2014 and was recording secretary of that group for 11 years. She is Member Emeritus of the Civil War Philatelic Authentication Service.

Kaufmann was editor and co-editor of The Confederate Philatelist for seventeen years. She was editor-in-chief of the 2012 Confederate States of America Catalog and Handbook of Stamps and Postal History, published by the Confederate Stamp Alliance. Kaufmann also served as section editor of The Confederate Stampless Cover Catalog. Kaufmann writes columns and serves as associate editor for the American Stamp Collector and Dealer, The Civil War Philatelist, La Posta, Kelleher's Stamp Collector's Quarterly, and is a regular contributor to the American Philatelist.

== Honors ==
- 1971, 2013, 2018 2022– August Dietz Award for distinguished research and writing - Civil War Philatelic Society
- 1974, 1980, 2013 – Haydn Myer Award for Distinguished Service to CWPS - Civil War Philatelic Society
- 2016, 2017 - Civil War Philatelist Writers Award - Civil War Philatelic Society (for best article in that year)
- 2017 Writers' Unit Hall of Fame – APS Writers' Unit 30
- 2018 Distinguished Philatelist – U.S. Philatelic Classics Society
