= John H. Boyle =

Captain John Henry Boyle (died 1880) was an officer of the Confederate Army who found himself in conflict with the law on several occasions, being arrested or captured at least five times and eventually being named as a suspect in the assassination of Abraham Lincoln at the conclusion of the American Civil War.

During the 1860 presidential election, Boyle had been accused of voter suppression in Prince George's and Charles counties, Maryland, alongside George Baden, William Berry, and James Judson Jarboe.

On January 20, 1863, Boyle was captured in-uniform at his mother's house in Marlborough, Maryland, and spent five months in the Old Brick Capitol prison awaiting possible execution. On May 19, 1863, he was part of a prisoner exchange, and was soon after involved at the Battle of Gettysburg under Brig. Gen. George H. Steuart, who named Boyle in dispatches, "and Mr. John H. Boyle, volunteer aide–I am greatly indebted for valuable assistance rendered, and of whose gallant bearing I cannot too highly make mention."

== Murder of Capt. Watkins ==
In 1864, U.S. General E. B. Tyler ordered Capt. Thomas Watkins that Boyle should be arrested as a horse thief, having previously been held twice before as a spy. Upon learning he was wanted, Boyle stole a horse from the Davidson, Maryland home where Watkins was staying but was pursued to the J.T. Hardesty shopfront in Collington, Maryland where he shot at Watkins but hit Watkins' horse instead.

Boyle was arrested by Watkins, but escaped when he hit Watkins in the head. He moved to safety with help from underground Confederate forces in St Mary's County while repeatedly vowing he'd return to kill Watkins eventually. Watkins, meanwhile, had to resign his US Army commission due to the head injury.

On November 9, 1864, Boyle sent death threats to Dr. George Mudd, the cousin of Dr. Samuel Mudd, and later sent death threats to Watkins. Boyle eventually returned to Watkin's home on March 25, 1865 with several cohorts. Sources differ on whether Boyle and his coconspirators knocked on the door and shot Watkins upon being greeted, or whether they snuck in a side door and shot Watkins while he was eating dinner or reading in front of the fireplace. Watkins' wife Julia and infant daughter Margaret were unharmed. The attackers stole three horses and departed as a doctor arrived on-site and spotted them. The following day, a local shop named Coffren's in Croom was robbed by three men in Confederate uniforms, presumed to be Boyle and/or cohorts from Mosby's Raiders. Governor Augustus Bradford announced a $1000 reward for Boyle.

== Attack on Seward and assassination of Lincoln ==
On April 14th, 1865, U.S. Secretary of State William H. Seward was attacked in his Washington, D.C. home as part of the larger Booth conspiracy to plunge the United States into chaos with the planned assassinations of president Abraham Lincoln, vice president Andrew Johnson, and the secretary of state Seward. While it was Lewis Powell, of the Confederate Secret Service and Mosby's Rangers, who stabbed Seward, reports by War Department investigator Lt. David D. Dana initially named Boyle as the attacker. When investigators reached Dr. Samuel Mudd, who had treated John Wilkes Booth in the days after the assassination, Mudd claimed that "fears of the vengeance of that desperado [Boyle]" were the reason he had not gone to authorities to report the stranger who demanded treatment–Boyle had previously threatened Mudd's cousin. Pearson, the husband of Boyle's sister, was also briefly named as a suspect by A.I. Fisher following a report by an unknown man using the pseudonym John Lyon. Boyle arrived in Bryantown the day after Lincoln's assassination, staying with Thomas Cage for a night before being scared into the forests by the arrival of apparent soldiers. He then stayed with Truman Canters in Benedict.

Boyle was arrested in Frederick, Maryland after Lincoln's assassination. In June 1865, he was convicted of assault with intent to kill in the death of Watkins, as well as larceny. He was sentenced to six years on the first count and four years on the second count. In 1870, Boyle was convicted of burglary and sentenced to three years in prison.

Boyle was reportedly pardoned by Governor William Pinkney Whyte in 1872, for "his war-time activities", with the Baltimore Sun reporting that "Boyle is not expected to live a great while, and his friends intend to move him to Florida". Following his release, Boyle worked as a detective for the Chicago, St. Louis and New Orleans Railroad until he was accused of passing counterfeit money, and settled with his family in Tougaloo, Mississippi.

== Death ==
In 1880, Boyle was assassinated in his home by an unidentified shooter. Detective Allan Pinkerton refused to take the case, noting Boyle had been "one of the worst men he ever knew...good riddance". A local black man named Henry Barnes was briefly arrested, and a story circulated that he and Boyle had intended to rob a train together, with Barnes murdering Boyle after the latter's withdrawal from the plot–a Grand Jury determined there was no evidence against Barnes, and the charges were dropped.
