= List of Missouri units in the American Civil War =

List of Missouri Civil War units may refer to:

- List of Missouri Confederate Civil War units
- List of Missouri Union Civil War units
