= List of Confederate units from Missouri in the American Civil War =

This is a list of Missouri Confederate Civil War units, or military units from the state of Missouri which fought for the Confederacy in the American Civil War. A border state with both southern and northern influences, Missouri attempted to remain neutral when the war began. However, this was unacceptable to the Federal government, and Union military forces moved against the capital to arrest the legislature and the governor. Governor Claiborne Jackson called out the Missouri State Guard to resist. Union forces under Gen. Nathaniel Lyon seized the state capital, and a minority of pro-Union members of the legislature declared the governor removed from office. They appointed a pro-Union governor, and the Federal government recognized him even though he had not been elected. This resulted in a civil war within the state, as Missourians divided and joined both the Union and Confederate armies. Missouri sent representatives to the United States Congress and the Confederate States Congress, and was represented by a star on both flags.

Early in 1861, the Missouri State Guard was formed as a replacement to a state militia force that had previously been in existence. Sterling Price was selected by Governor Jackson to command the unit. Volunteers for the Missouri State Guard were organized into companies of 50 to 100 men, which were then assigned to regiments. Each regiment was designed to contain between six and eight companies, so a Missouri State Guard regiment would contain 600 to 800 men at full strength. At the Battle of Wilson's Creek on August 10, 1861, Missouri State Guard units fought alongside Confederate States Army troops; both the Missourians and the Confederate troops were under the command of Confederate Brigadier General Benjamin McCulloch. Beginning on November 25, 1861, the men of the Missouri State Guard were allowed to transfer from the Guard to official Confederate service. At the Battle of Pea Ridge in March 1862, Price commanded a mixed force that contained both Confederate soldiers from Missouri and elements of the Missouri State Guard. By July 1862, almost all of the Missouri State Guard had left the unit to join Confederate States Army units.

The list of Missouri Union Civil War units is shown separately.

== Infantry ==
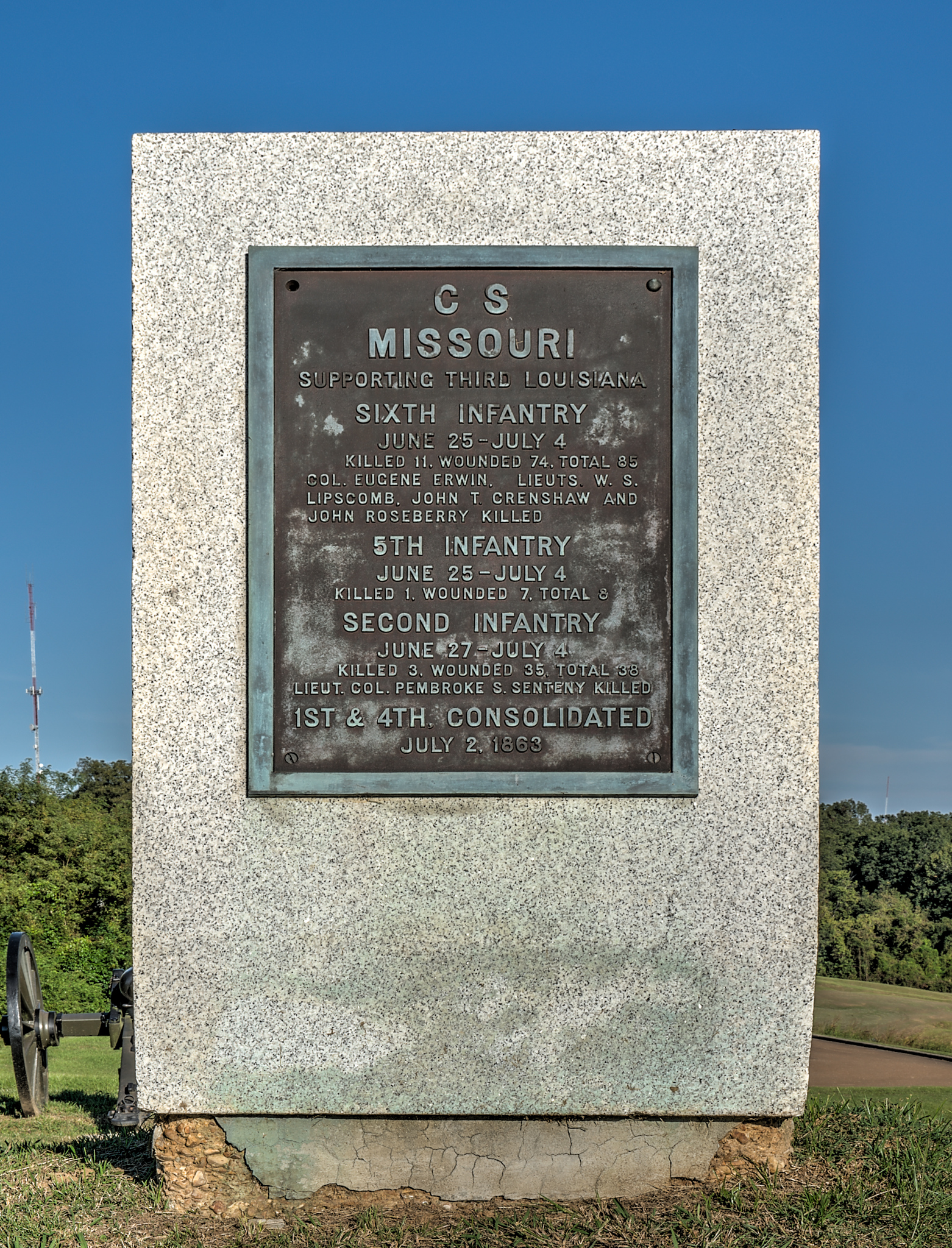
Memorial at Vicksburg National Military Park

The Van Dorn pattern battle flag carried by the 4th Missouri Infantry

- 1st Missouri Brigade
- 1st Infantry (1st-4th Consolidated Infantry)
- 2nd Infantry (2nd-6th Consolidated Infantry)
- 3rd Infantry (3rd-5th Consolidated Infantry)
- 4th Infantry (1st-4th Consolidated Infantry)
- 5th Infantry (3rd-5th Consolidated Infantry)
- 6th Infantry (2nd-6th Consolidated Infantry)
- 8th Infantry
- 9th Infantry
- 10th Infantry
- 11th Infantry
- 12th Infantry
- 16th Infantry
- Winston's Regiment, Infantry
- 1st Battalion Missouri, Infantry
- 3rd Battalion, Infantry
- 8th Battalion, Infantry
- Perkins' Battalion, Infantry

=== Sharpshooters ===
- 9th Battalion, Sharpshooters
- Searcy's Battalion, Sharpshooters

== Cavalry ==
Battle flag of the 1st Missouri Cavalry

- Shelby's Iron Brigade
- 1st Cavalry (1st-3rd Btln. Consolidated Cavalry)
- 1st Northeast Cavalry
- 2nd Cavalry (formerly 4th Battalion)
- 2nd Northeast Cavalry (Franklin's Regiment)
- 3rd Cavalry
- 4th Cavalry
- 5th Cavalry
- 6th (Phelan's) Cavalry
- 6th Cavalry (Coffee's, 11th Cavalry, 3rd Trans-Mississippi Cavalry)
- 7th Cavalry
- 8th Cavalry
- 9th (Elliott's) Cavalry (formerly 10th Battalion)
- 10th Cavalry (formerly 11th Battalion)
- 12th Cavalry
- 13th (Wood's) Cavalry (formerly 14th Battalion)
- 15th Cavalry
- Coleman's Regiment, Cavalry (incomplete)
- Freeman's Regiment, Cavalry (formerly Freeman's Battalion)
- Fristoe's Regiment, Cavalry
- Hunter's Regiment, Cavalry
- Jackman's Regiment, Cavalry
- Lawther's Temporary Regiment, Dismounted Cavalry
- Poindexter's Regiment, Cavalry
- Slayback's Regiment, Cavalry
- Williams' Regiment, Cavalry
- 3rd Battalion, Cavalry (1st-3rd Btln. Consolidated Cavalry)
- 17th (Norman's) Battalion, Cavalry
- Clardy's Battalion, Cavalry
- Davies' Battalion, Cavalry
- Ford's Battalion, Cavalry
- Preston's Battalion, Cavalry
- Schnabel's Battalion, Cavalry
- Shaw's Battalion, Cavalry
- Snider's Battalion, Cavalry
- Williams' Battalion, Cavalry
- Beck's Company, Cavalry
- Hick's Company, Cavalry
- Hobbs' Company, Cavalry
- Stallard's Company, Cavalry
- Woodson's Company, Cavalry - This company of exchanged Missourians was formed in Virginia in 1863 by Charles Woodson and E.H. Scott to serve in Virginia and they were designated the 1st Missouri Cavalry, Co. A. They were attached to the 62nd Virginia Mounted Infantry and fought at the Battle of New Market in 1864 where they sustained heavy casualties.

=== Mounted Infantry ===
- Boone's Regiment, Mounted Infantry

== Artillery ==
- 1st Battery, Light Artillery
- 1st Field Battery, Light Artillery
- 2nd Field Battery, Light Artillery
- 3rd Battery, Light Artillery
- 3rd Field Battery, Light Artillery
- 4th (Harris') Field Battery, Light Artillery
- 13th Missouri Battery, Light Artillery
- Farris' Battery, Light Artillery (Clark Artillery)
- Hamilton's (Prairie Gun) Battery, Light Artillery
- Barret's Company, Light Artillery
- Bledsoe's Company, Light Artillery
- Landis' Company, Light Artillery
- Lowe's Company, Artillery (Jackson Battery)
- McDonald's Company, Light Artillery
- Parson's Company, Light Artillery
- von Phul's Company, Light Artillery
- Walsh's Company, Light Artillery

== Misc ==
- Dorsey's Regiment, State Guard
- Douglas' Regiment
- Lawther's Partisan Rangers
- Parsons' Regiment
- Quantrill's Company
- Missouri State Guard
- Thompson's Command

== Arkansas soldiers in Missouri units ==
In addition to serving in Confederate units organized in Arkansas, many Arkansas soldiers would serve in Confederate units organized in Missouri. Because Missouri Confederate troops were effectively driven out of the geographic area of Missouri after the Pea Ridge Campaign, except during raids by Generals Marmaduke, Shelby and Price, many of the Missouri units recruited heavily in Arkansas. This practice led some Missouri units to be mislabeled as Arkansas units when Confederate service records were compiled by the United States War Department in the 1880s, and some Arkansas units being mislabeled as Missouri units. Troops living near the borders with other states often enlisted in the nearest unit, even if across the state line, resulting in Arkansas soldiers enlisting in units from Missouri, Louisiana and Tennessee. The following is a list of Missouri units that contained large numbers of Arkansas soldiers:

Regiment	Organization Date	Commanders	Alternated designations
Coffee's Arkansas Cavalry Regiment		Col. John T. Coffee Colonel Gideon W. Thompson Colonel Moses W. Smith	6th Missouri Cavalry 11th Missouri Cavalry
Freeman's Missouri Cavalry Regiment	January 16, 1864	Colonel Thomas R. Freeman Major Martin V. Shaver	
Fristoe's Missouri Cavalry Regiment	July, 1864	Colonel Edward T. Fristoe	
Jackman's Arkansas Cavalry Regiment	Spring 1864	Colonel Sidney D. Jackman	Nichols' Arkansas Cavalry Regiment Jackman's Missouri Cavalry
Kitchen's Missouri Cavalry Regiment	April 9, 1863	Colonel Solomon George Kitchen	10th Missouri Cavalry 7th Missouri Cavalry Regiment Kitchen's Battalion Missouri Cavalry
Nichols' Arkansas Cavalry Regiment	Spring 1864	Colonel Charles H. Nichols	Jackman's Arkansas Cavalry Regiment
Schnabel's Missouri Battalion Cavalry		Lieutenant Colonel John A. Schnabel	

== See also ==
- Lists of American Civil War Regiments by State
- Confederate Units by State

== Sources ==
- Gottschalk, Phil (1991). In Deadly Earnest: The Missouri Brigade. Columbia, Missouri: Missouri River Press. ISBN 0-9631136-1-5.
- McGhee, James E. (2008). Guide to Missouri Confederate Regiments, 1861–1865. Fayetteville, Arkansas: University of Arkansas Press. ISBN 978-1-55728-870-7.
