= Barrett's Missouri Battery =

Barrett's Missouri Battery 10th Missouri Light Battery
- Active: April 1, 1862 to April 16, 1865
- Allegiance: Confederate States of America
- Branch: Confederate States Army
- Type: Artillery
- Equipment: 2 × 6-pounder smoothbore cannons and 2 × 12-pounder howitzers (1862); 4 × 2 × 12-pounder howitzers (1864)
- Engagements: American Civil War: Battle of Perryville; Battle of Stones River; Chickamauga campaign; Battle of Missionary Ridge; Battle of Ringgold Gap; Atlanta campaign; Battle of Columbus

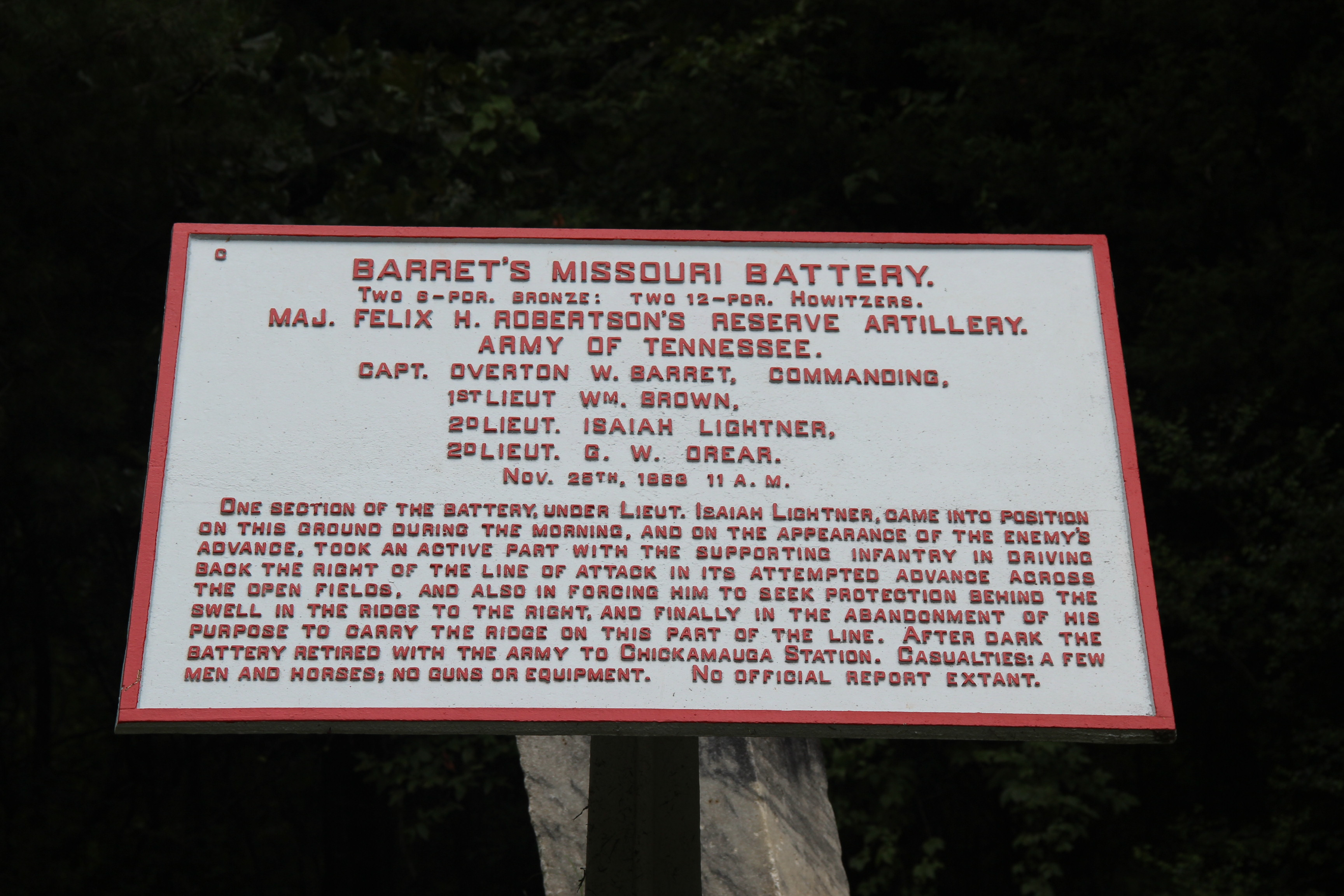
Barret's Missouri Battery marker, Missionary Ridge

Barrett's Missouri Battery was an artillery battery that served in the Confederate States Army during the American Civil War. After entering Confederate service on April 1, 1862, the unit was armed with two 6-pounder smoothbore cannons and two 12-pounder howitzers and was commanded by Captain Overton W. Barrett. It was present during the Siege of Corinth, but saw no action. During the Battle of Perryville in October 1862, Barrett's battery provided artillery support for a Confederate brigade. After spending the next several months moving around Tennessee, the battery supported a Confederate attack during the Battle of Stones River in December. The 1863 Chickamauga campaign brought light action for the unit, which also fought in the Battle of Missionary Ridge. When the Confederates retreated after the Missionary Ridge fighting, Barrett's battery was part of the Confederate rear guard at the Battle of Ringgold Gap, earning the praise of Patrick R. Cleburne. Rearmed with four 12-pounder howitzers, the unit was action in the 1864 Atlanta campaign as part of the Confederate reserve artillery, although two of the cannons were lost to attrition. On April 16, 1865, the battery ceased to exist when its flag, cannons, and most of its members were captured during the Battle of Columbus, Georgia. As of January 2021, its battle flag is part of the collection of the Missouri State Museum.

== Background ==
When the American Civil War began in 1861, the state of Missouri was politically divided, with substantial portions of the population holding either pro-secession or anti-secession beliefs. Governor Claiborne Fox Jackson was a secessionist and supported the Confederate States of America, and mobilized elements of the state militia in an effort to capture the St. Louis Arsenal. On May 10, Jackson's men were dispersed by Brigadier General Nathaniel Lyon of the Union Army; a pro-secession riot in St. Louis followed. Jackson responded by forming the Missouri State Guard (MSG) and appointing Major General Sterling Price as its commander. In June, Lyon evicted Jackson, the MSG, and the pro-secession elements of the state legislature from the state capital of Jefferson City. The secessionists retreated to southwestern Missouri, all the while pursued by Lyon. On August 10, Lyon attacked the combined camp of the MSG and Confederate States Army elements commanded by Brigadier General Benjamin McCulloch, which was near Springfield. In the ensuing Battle of Wilson's Creek, Lyon was killed and his army routed. Price followed up on his victory, leading the MSG north towards the Missouri River; by winter, Union reinforcements had chased them back into southwestern Missouri. In the Battle of Pea Ridge, fought on March 7 and 8, 1862, in northwestern Arkansas, Price and the MSG suffered another defeat while serving under Major General Earl Van Dorn. After Pea Ridge, Van Dorn's army was transferred east of the Mississippi River. Eventually, many of the men of the MSG joined Confederate Army units.

== Service history ==
=== Formation and Perryville ===
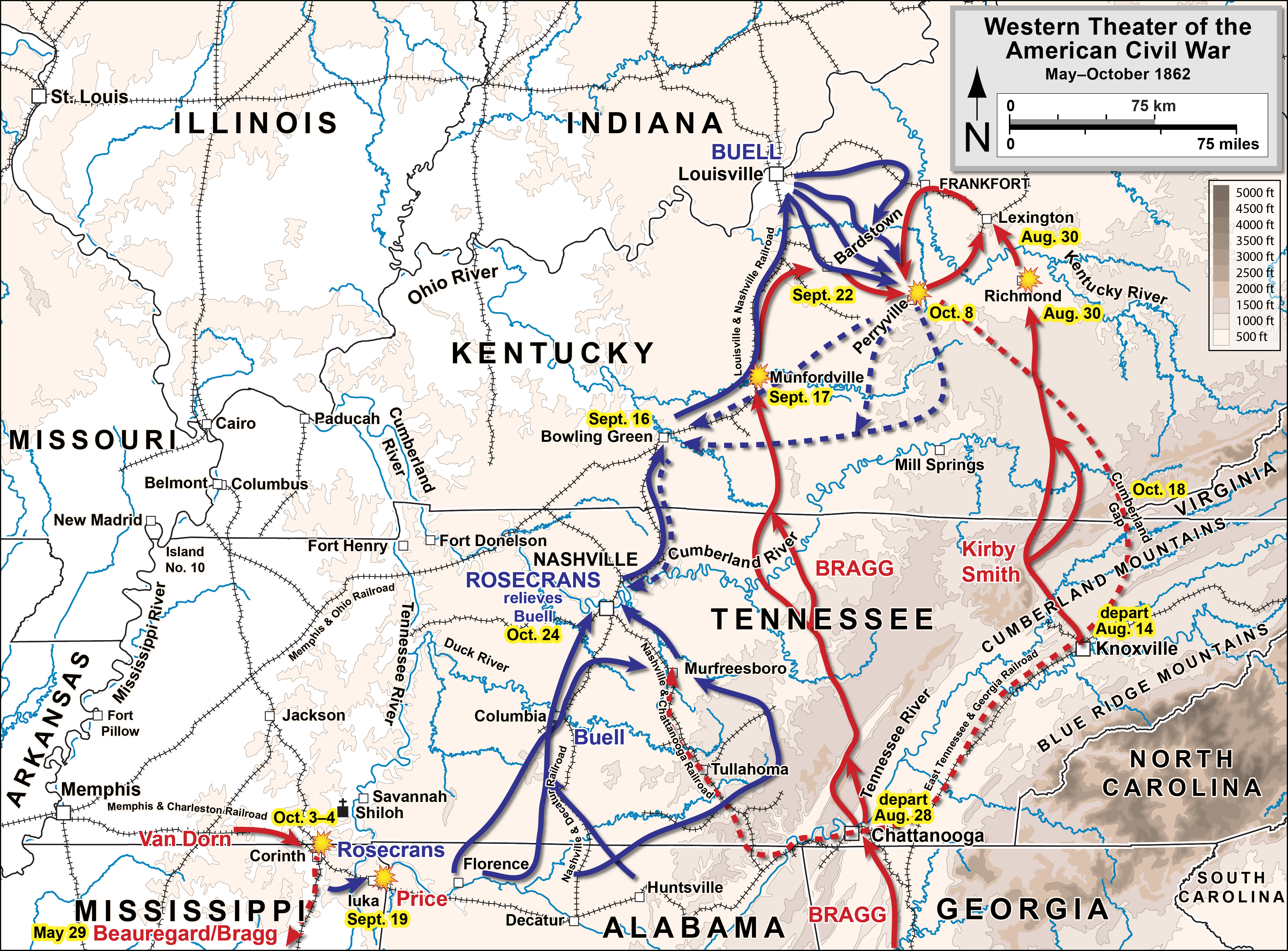
Movements during the Confederate Heartland Offensive

Barrett's Missouri Battery joined the Confederate Army on April 1, 1862, while the men were at Memphis, Tennessee. Captain D. A. Rice had been associated with unit, but did not continue with it after the organization date, so command was held by Captain Overton W. Barrett. At first, Barrett's Battery was not issued cannons and was sent to Corinth, Mississippi, where it was armed on May 19 with two 6-pounder smoothbores and two 12-pounder howitzers. The 6-pounder smoothbores were obsolescent, fired at a flat trajectory, and had a range of 1,500 yards (1.4 km). The howitzers had a maximum range of 1,072 yards (980 m) and fired with a higher trajectory, which was useful where rough terrain made projectiles fired with a flat trajectory ineffective. Confederate artillerymen were hampered by problems with gunpowder and artillery fuze quality, which often resulted in premature detonation of shells, sometimes while still in the cannon. American Civil War cannons generally required a crew of four to six men.

Union troops placed Corinth under siege, bringing on the Siege of Corinth. While Barrett's battery was present in Corinth during the siege, it did not see fighting. The Confederates eventually abandoned the town during the night of May 29/30. On July 21, Barrett's battery received reinforcements when men from a defunct Louisiana artillery unit known as the Orleans Guard Battery joined the Missourians. After being assigned to the brigade of Colonel Samuel Powell, the strengthened battery participated in the Confederate Heartland Offensive. That campaign was an operation led by Confederate General Braxton Bragg, who had forces in Union-held Kentucky along with Major General Kirby Smith. Control of Kentucky was believed to be vital to the course of the war, as if Kentucky joined the Confederacy, Missouri and Maryland were thought to be likely to do so as well. In early October, elements from both Bragg's army and a Union army commanded by Major General Don Carlos Buell gathered near Perryville, Kentucky, and the Battle of Perryville was fought on October 8.

During the early stages of the fighting at Perryville, Powell advanced his brigade onto the field, but deployed them too far to the rear, leaving the formation isolated on the Confederate left. Barrett's battery, still armed with the four 6-pounders, took up a position atop a forested hill. Later in the battle, Powell's infantry was sent forward from the battery's position to attack a Union battery on another hill, although a single regiment was left to protect the artillery. Once Powell's attack began, Barrett's battery opened fire on the Union artillery at a range of 0.75 miles (1.21 km). When the attack was followed by a successful Union counterattack, the battery fired inaccurately at the advancing Union soldiers before retreating to a new position further to the rear. That secondary line was also attacked, and Powell's men were forced back to the Chaplin River. The unit did not report suffering any casualties during the fighting. The Confederates retreated after the battle, and Barrett's battery was stationed at various points in Tennessee until December.

=== Stones River and Chickamauga ===
In December 1862, a Union army commanded by Major General William S. Rosecrans moved against the position of Bragg's army near Murfreesboro, Tennessee. Bragg did not retreat and instead attacked Rosecrans's force on December 31, bringing on the Battle of Stones River. During the battle, Barrett's battery was part of the Confederate center, working with the brigade of Brigadier General Edward C. Walthall. When Confederate troops were preparing to attack Colonel Timothy Robbins Stanley's brigade, Barrett's and three other batteries fired into the Union line, wreaking havoc that helped force the retreat of Stanley's men. The historian Peter Cozzens described the four batteries's fire as the "only instance of [Confederate] artillery support" during the fighting. Barrett's battery saw four of its members wounded at Stones River. The unit reported having problems with the quality of its case shot, as almost all of the 73 rounds of case shot fired by the battery exploded prematurely. In March 1863, Bragg began a push to replace all of the 6-pounders and 12-pounder howitzers from his army, as they were being outperformed by Union guns. Replacement cannons were slow in arriving, and in May Barrett's battery was still armed with two 6-pounders and two 12-pounder howitzers. The battery was also assigned to Bragg's artillery reserve that spring. The Orleans Guard Battery was reformed, and the former members of it assigned to Barrett's battery were returned to the Louisiana unit on July 11. After spending some time as part of the garrison of Chattanooga, Tennessee, Barrett's battery moved into Georgia.

Meanwhile, Rosecrans had moved his army towards Chattanooga, capturing the place in early September. Bragg, in turn, prepared for a counterattack; the Chickamauga campaign had begun. During the Confederate advance during the campaign, Barrett's battery successfully fought a Union cavalry detachment at LaFayette, Georgia, on September 7. Bragg's and Rosecrans's armies made preliminary contact on September 18, and the Battle of Chickamauga was joined on September 19. Barrett's battery was held in reserve along with other artillery units and was not heavily engaged at Chickamauga. The battery was then reinforced again, when members of Sengstak's Alabama Battery, who had been captured during the Siege of Vicksburg, were exchanged and assigned to Barrett's battery.

=== Missionary Ridge and Ringgold Gap ===
After Chickamauga, the Union army retreated to Chattanooga, which the Confederates soon put under siege. Part of the Confederate defenses were on Missionary Ridge, a ridge east of the city. In mid-October, Rosecrans was removed from command and replaced by Major General George Thomas. On November 25, Thomas's men attacked the Confederate position on Missionary Ridge, driving the defenders from the position. Other Union assailants attacked Patrick R. Cleburne's men further to the north, although Cleburne's men fought a strong rear guard action. Barrett's battery fought at multiple different points on the Confederate line, including with Cleburne and at a different point in the Confederate right center. At one point, the battery was positioned on a hilltop position south of Tunnel Hill, where it fired effectively into the Union right. The battery was forced to abandon a caisson on the field after it suffered damage. Two days after the fighting on Missionary Ridge, Cleburne was again holding the Confederate rear guard, this time during the Battle of Ringgold Gap. Barrett's battery saw action at Ringgold Gap, with one section slowing the Union advance enough to receive praise from Cleburne.

=== Atlanta and Columbus ===
In the spring of 1864, Union Major General William T. Sherman was ordered to drive a large force into Georgia, in hopes of tying down Confederate troops that could otherwise be sent to the fighting in Virginia and capture the vital rail center of Atlanta. Barrett's battery was armed with four 12-pounder howitzers before the Atlanta campaign, although by the end of October, one of the pieces had been condemned and another had exploded. As part of the Confederate artillery reserve, the unit fought throughout the Atlanta campaign, which ended in September after Sherman took Atlanta. On April 16, 1865, Barrett's battery fought in one of the last battles to take place east of the Mississippi River during the war, the Battle of Columbus, Georgia. In the battle, Major General James H. Wilson's Union cavalry attacked the Confederate defenders of Columbus, who were defeated. Barrett's battery was wrecked during the battle, losing its battle flag, cannons, and most of its soldiers to capture; the unit ceased to exist after the battle. Over the course of its existence, about 200 men served with the unit, and at least eight of them died of various causes during their service. As of January 2021, the unit's flag is in the collection of the Missouri State Museum.

== Sources ==
- Bohannon, Keith S. (1998). "Ringgold Gap, Georgia". In Kennedy, Frances H. (ed.). The Civil War Battlefield Guide (2nd ed.). Boston/New York: Houghton Mifflin. ISBN 978-0-395-74012-5.
- Cozzens, Peter (1991) [1990]. No Better Place to Die: The Battle of Stones River. Urbana, Illinois: University of Illinois Press. ISBN 0-252-06229-9.
- Daniel, Larry J. (2015) [2005]. Cannoneers in Gray: The Field Artillery of the Army of Tennessee (Revised ed.). Tuscaloosa, Alabama: University of Alabama Press. ISBN 0-8173-5168-X.
- Gottschalk, Phil (1991). In Deadly Earnest: The Missouri Brigade. Columbia, Missouri: Missouri River Press. ISBN 978-0-9631136-1-0.
- Hatcher, Richard (1998). "Wilson's Creek, Missouri". In Kennedy, Frances H. (ed.). The Civil War Battlefield Guide (2nd ed.). Boston/New York: Houghton Mifflin. ISBN 978-0-395-74012-5.
- Hawke, Paul (1998). "Perryville, Kentucky". In Kennedy, Frances H. (ed.). The Civil War Battlefield Guide (2nd ed.). Boston/New York: Houghton Mifflin. ISBN 978-0-395-74012-5.
- Kennedy, Frances H., ed. (1998). The Civil War Battlefield Guide (2nd ed.). Boston/New York: Houghton Mifflin. ISBN 978-0-395-74012-5.
- Luvaas, Jay (1998). "Rocky Face Ridge, Georgia". In Kennedy, Frances H. (ed.). The Civil War Battlefield Guide (2nd ed.). Boston/New York: Houghton Mifflin. ISBN 978-0-395-74012-5.
- McGhee, James E. (2008). Guide to Missouri Confederate Regiments, 1861–1865. Fayetteville, Arkansas: University of Arkansas Press. ISBN 978-1-55728-870-7.
- McWhiney, Grady (1998). "Stones River, Tennessee". In Kennedy, Frances H. (ed.). The Civil War Battlefield Guide (2nd ed.). Boston/New York: Houghton Mifflin. ISBN 978-0-395-74012-5.
- Noe, Kenneth W. (2011) [2001]. Perryville: This Grand Havoc of Battle (Paperback ed.). Lexington, Kentucky: University Press of Kentucky. ISBN 978-0-8131-3384-3.
- Parrish, T. Michael (1998). "Siege of Corinth, Mississippi". In Kennedy, Frances H. (ed.). The Civil War Battlefield Guide (2nd ed.). Boston/New York: Houghton Mifflin. ISBN 978-0-395-74012-5.
- Ripley, Warren (1970). Artillery and Ammunition of the Civil War. New York, New York: Promontory Press. ISBN 0-88394-003-5.
- Robertson, William Glenn (1998). "Chickamagua, Georgia". In Kennedy, Frances H. (ed.). The Civil War Battlefield Guide (2nd ed.). Boston/New York: Houghton Mifflin. ISBN 978-0-395-74012-5.
- Roland, Charles P. (1998). "Chattanooga III, Tennessee". In Kennedy, Frances H. (ed.). The Civil War Battlefield Guide (2nd ed.). Boston/New York: Houghton Mifflin. ISBN 978-0-395-74012-5.
- Shea, William L.; Hess, Earl J. (1998). "Pea Ridge, Arkansas". In Kennedy, Frances H. (ed.). The Civil War Battlefield Guide (2nd ed.). Boston/New York: Houghton Mifflin. ISBN 978-0-395-74012-5.
- Woodhead, Henry, ed. (1996) [1991]. Echoes of Glory: Arms and Equipment of the Confederacy. Alexandria, Virginia: Time-Life. ISBN 0-8094-8850-7.
