= Winston's Regiment =

Winston's Regiment, Missouri Infantry
- Active: 1861 – 1865
- Country: Confederate States of America
- Allegiance: Confederate States Army
- Branch: Infantry
- Type: Line Infantry
- Size: Regiment (approx. 3,500 recruited initially)
- Part of: Trans-Mississippi Department
- Engagements: American Civil War * Siege of Lexington * Battle of Blue Mills Landing

Commanders
- Current commander: Colonel John H. Winston

Winston's Regiment, Missouri Infantry was an infantry regiment that served in the Confederate States Army during the American Civil War. Organized primarily in northwestern Missouri under the direction of Colonel John H. Winston, the unit saw intense deployment across the regional Missouri River crossings during the early maneuvers of 1861.

== Organization ==
The regiment was initially established in northwestern Missouri, heavily drawing volunteers from Clay, Platte, and Clinton counties. The unit's organizational structure included several specialized companies, including Company A, which initially enrolled at Abbeyville, Mississippi. At its numerical peak during mobilization, the command consolidated roughly 3,500 men, a significant portion of whom were initially mounted for long-distance transit alongside a baggage train of sixty wagons.

== History ==
Following its concentration at St. Joseph, the regiment marched toward Lexington to join forces with Major General Sterling Price. Recognizing the threat of the deployment, Federal forces attempted to block Winston's crossing of the Missouri River in September 1861, culminating in tactical movements around Blue Mills Landing. Winston's Regiment successfully secured their river transport, providing critical reinforcements to the main Confederate concentrations confronting Federal garrisons at the First Battle of Lexington. The regiment spent the remainder of the war operating within the understaffed Trans-Mississippi theater before its eventual surrender and parole in May 1865.

== See also ==
- List of Confederate units from Missouri in the American Civil War
