= Boone's Regiment =

Boone's Regiment, Missouri Mounted Infantry
- Active: Early 1862 – 1865
- Country: Confederate States of America
- Allegiance: Confederate States Army
- Branch: Infantry / Cavalry
- Type: Mounted Infantry / Partisan Rangers
- Size: 144 men (tracked roster)
- Part of: Trans-Mississippi Department
- Engagements: American Civil War: Operations in Missouri

Commanders
- Current commander: Colonel John C. Boone

Boone's Regiment, Missouri Mounted Infantry (also known as the 1st Mounted Infantry Regiment) was a mounted infantry regiment that served in the Confederate States Army during the American Civil War. Organized in early 1862 primarily from volunteers raised in Boone County, Missouri, the unit engaged extensively in regional partisan and guerilla operations throughout the state.

== Organization ==
The regiment was established early in 1862 under the command of Colonel John C. Boone.Unlike traditional infantry line regiments, Boone's command operated with an adaptable, decentralized company structure to better facilitate irregular operations behind enemy lines.The unit's active field records list two primary initial companies: * Company A, commanded by Captain Nathaniel Ferguson.* An unlettered company, commanded by Captain James Grant Provines. The soldiers on the unit's roster were primarily recruited from central Missouri, specifically Boone, Howard, and Callaway counties.

== History ==
Operating primarily as a decentralized command, the unit specialized in scouting, ambushing Federal supply columns, and raiding Union communication networks within the Trans-Mississippi theater. Because they frequently moved through territory heavily occupied by Union garrisons, the regiment operated under conditions closely resembling guerrilla warfare. Due to the hazardous nature of their irregular operations, members of the regiment were highly susceptible to counter-guerilla sweeps organized by the Missouri State Militia. A significant portion of the unit's surviving military service logs consist of capture records across various northern and central Missouri counties, with prisoners frequently transferred to military prisons in St. Louis and Alton, Illinois.The remnants of the unit dissolved following the general surrender of Confederate Trans-Mississippi forces in May 1865.

== See also ==
- List of Confederate units from Missouri in the American Civil War
