= 1st and 4th Missouri Consolidated Infantry Regiment =

Infantry regiment in the Confederate States Army

1st and 4th Missouri Infantry (Consolidated)
- Active: November 7, 1862 to April 9, 1865
- Allegiance: Confederate States of America
- Branch: Confederate States Army
- Type: Infantry
- Engagements: Battle of Grand Gulf; Battle of Champion Hill; Battle of Big Black River Bridge; Siege of Vicksburg; Battle of New Hope Church; Battle of Kennesaw Mountain; Siege of Atlanta; Battle of Allatoona; Battle of Franklin (1864); Battle of Fort Blakeley

The 1st and 4th Missouri Infantry (Consolidated) was an infantry regiment that served in the Confederate States Army during the American Civil War. The regiment was formed on November 7, 1862, when the 1st Missouri Infantry and the 4th Missouri Infantry were consolidated as a result of heavy battle losses in both units. The regiment served in several battles in the 1863 Vicksburg campaign, including a charge that almost broke the Union line at the Battle of Champion Hill. When the Siege of Vicksburg ended with a Confederate surrender, the regiment was captured and later exchanged. In 1864, the regiment fought in the Atlanta campaign, and suffered heavy losses at the Battle of Franklin. On April 9, 1865, the regiment surrendered at the Battle of Fort Blakeley, and was paroled in May when the war ended for all effective purposes.

== Organization ==
On November 7, 1862, the 1st Missouri Infantry and the 4th Missouri Infantry were combined into a single unit. The consolidation occurred because both units had suffered heavy losses. Because Archibald MacFarlane, the colonel of the 4th Missouri, had been severely wounded at the Second Battle of Corinth and was unfit for further service, Amos Camden Riley, colonel of the 1st Missouri, commanded the regiment. Hugh A. Garland served as the regiment's major; the regiment did not have a lieutenant colonel until Garland was promoted to that rank on May 1, 1863. The regiment's company organization as of November 7, 1862, was:

- Company "A": Originally Company "A" of the 1st. Commanded by William C. P. Carrington.
- Company "B": Originally Companies "A", "F", and "G" of the 4th. Commanded by Francis McShane.
- Company "C": Originally Companies "B" and "C" of the 4th. Commanded by Daniel Hays.
- Company "D": Originally Companies "B" and "D" of the 1st. Commanded by Robert J. Duffy.
- Company "E": Originally Companies "E" and "H" of the 4th. Commanded by Norval Spangler.
- Company "F": Originally Companies "E", "F", and "H" of the 1st. Commanded by Lewis H. Kennerly.
- Company "G": Originally Companies "C" and "G" of the 1st. Commanded by James MacFarland.
- Company "H": Originally Company "K" of the 4th. Commanded by Jeptha D. Feagan.
- Company "I": Originally Companies "D" and "I" of the 4th. Commanded by Matthew G. Norman.
- Company "K": Originally Companies "I" and "K" of the 1st. Commanded by Charles L. Edmondson.

== Service history ==
=== 1863 ===
==== Grand Gulf and Champion Hill ====
After organization, the new regiment was assigned to the First Missouri Brigade. The First Missouri Brigade, commanded by Colonel Francis M. Cockrell, was transferred to the vicinity of Grand Gulf, Mississippi in early March 1863. While at Grand Gulf, the brigade built fortifications. The 1st and 4th Missouri (Consolidated), along with the 2nd Missouri Infantry, 3rd Missouri Infantry, and Henry Guibor's artillery battery, crossed the Mississippi River to Louisiana to observe Union movements. On April 15, the Missourians were ordered back to Grand Gulf, and the regiment participated in artillery fire with Union naval ships at the Battle of Grand Gulf. After Union Major General Ulysses S. Grant landed in Mississippi in order to move against Vicksburg, Bowen sent many of his men from Grand Gulf to Port Gibson, Mississippi to try to stop Grant. However, the 1st and 4th Missouri (Consolidated) was on detached duty guarding a bridge, and missed the ensuing Battle of Port Gibson on May 1.

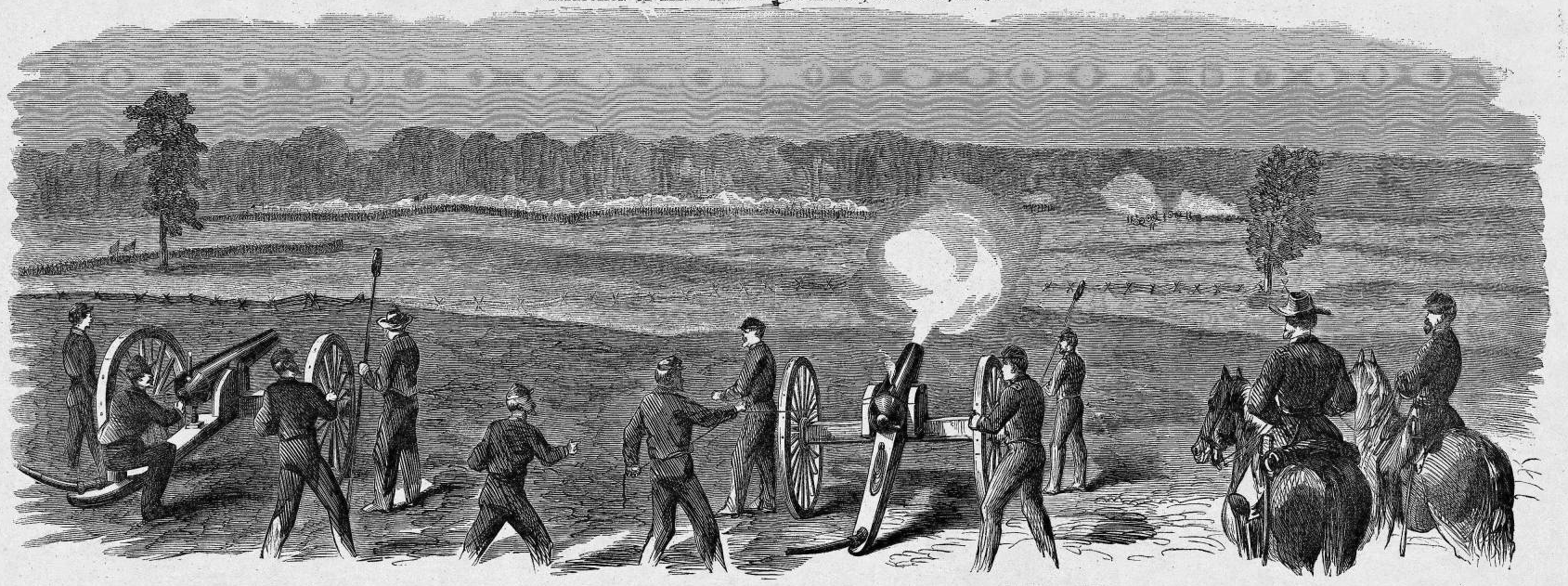
Battle of Champion Hill

After Bowen withdrew from the Port Gibson area, the 1st and 4th Missouri (Consolidated) was next engaged at the Battle of Champion Hill on May 16. Bowen's division was under the commanded of Lieutenant General John C. Pemberton, and Pemberton had aligned his troops near Champion Hill to try to stop Grant's advance towards Vicksburg. A strong Union assault broke the left flank of the Confederate line, and Cockrell's brigade was sent to try to prevent a complete collapse of the line. The 1st and 4th Missouri (Consolidated) formed on the right end of Cockrell's line, and soon came under heavy Union fire. The regiment then charged the Union position, buying time for Brigadier General Martin E. Green's Confederate brigade to arrive. Together, the brigades of Cockrell and Green, including the 1st and 4th Missouri (Consolidated), charged the Union line, which was driven back some distance. After driving Union troops from a crossroads and recapturing some cannons the Confederates had lost earlier in the battle, the Confederates charged towards the Champion family plantation, which was on a hill and was a key terrain feature. Brigadier General Alvin P. Hovey's Union division was broken by the Confederate charge, and the Confederates kept pressing forward. However, Union reinforcements and a strong line of artillery blunted the charge, and Bowen's men were forced to give up the ground they had gained. The 1st and 4th Missouri (Consolidated) lost six flagbearers at Champion Hill. In total, the regiment lost 46 men killed, 80 wounded, and 52 missing in the fight, for a total of 178.

==== Vicksburg ====
After the retreat from Champion Hill, the 1st and 4th Missouri (Consolidated) was next engaged on May 17, at the Battle of Big Black River Bridge. Cockrell's brigade, Green's brigade, and a brigade of Tennessee soldiers commanded by Brigadier General John C. Vaughn had formed a line protecting the bridge over the Big Black River. A Union charge broke the Confederate line, forcing most of the Confederates into a retreat that turned into a rout towards the river crossing. The 1st and 4th Missouri (Consolidated) provided a rear guard for the fleeing Confederates, and was one of the few Confederate units to leave the field without routing. After the fight at the Big Black River, the Confederate army retreated within the defenses of Vicksburg. During the Siege of Vicksburg, the 1st and 4th Missouri (Consolidated) helped defeat Union attacks on May 19 and 22, and the regiment captured the flag of the 8th Missouri Infantry Regiment during the former engagement. The regiment also saw action on July 1, helping to plug a gap in the Confederate line after a Union mine exploded a portion of the Confederate line. During the siege, the regiment lost 34 men killed and 59 wounded; the remaining 344 men of the regiment were captured by Union forces when the Confederate garrison surrendered on July 4. After the surrender, the men of the regiment were paroled, and were ordered to wait at Demopolis, Alabama until officially exchanged. Many of the Missourians did not report to Demopolis. The prisoner exchange process was completed on September 12, allowing the unit to rejoin Confederate service. In October, the regiment became part of the division of Major General Samuel French at Meridian, Mississippi. The regiment was later transferred to Mobile, Alabama, and then served patrol duty for a time in northern Alabama.

=== 1864 ===
==== Atlanta campaign ====
The 1st and 4th Missouri (Consolidated) and Cockrell's Missouri Brigade fought as a unit of the Confederate Army of Tennessee during the Atlanta campaign from May to September 1864. During the campaign, the regiment was part of French's division of Major General Leonidas Polk's corps. Cockrell, now promoted to brigadier general, still commanded the brigade the regiment was in. Besides the 1st and 4th Missouri (Consolidated), Cockrell's brigade contained the 2nd and 6th Missouri (Consolidated), the 3rd and 5th Missouri (Consolidated), and the 1st and 3rd Missouri Cavalry (Consolidated). The regiment was engaged at the Battle of New Hope Church on May 25 and 26, where Colonel Riley was killed in action. Regimental command then passed to Hugh Garland, who was promoted to colonel on May 30.

The regiment was then in combat at the Battle of Kennesaw Mountain on June 27. At Kennesaw Mountain, the 1st and 4th Missouri (Consolidated) and the rest of Cockrell's brigade was part of the Confederate line at a promontory named Pigeon Hill. Cockrell's brigade had deployed skirmishers, who were quickly driven in when the Union troops charged the position on Pigeon Hill. Cockrell's men drove back all of the Union assaults made against their position, and were engaged in combat for about an hour. Cockrell's brigade, including the 1st and 4th Missouri (Consolidated), participated in several smaller engagements during the Atlanta campaign, as well as the Siege of Atlanta. The regiment lost 19 men killed, 57 wounded, and 4 missing over the course of the campaign, for a total of 80.

==== Franklin-Nashville campaign ====
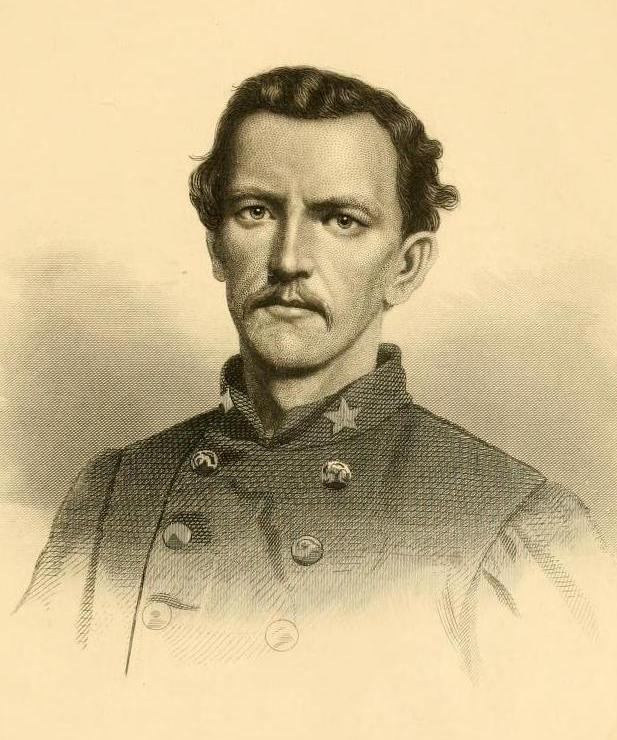
Colonel Hugh A. Garland Jr., killed in action at the Battle of Franklin

Cockrell's Missouri troops were heavily engaged in the Battle of Allatoona on October 5, 1864. General John Bell Hood, now commander of the Confederate army, dispatched French's division, which contained Cockrell's brigade, to capture a fortified Union position at Allatoona Pass. At Allatoona, Cockrell's four-regiment brigade aligned with the 1st and 4th Missouri (Consolidated) second from the left. Cockrell's brigade initially drove in Union skirmishers and captured an outer redoubt. The 1st and 4th Missouri (Consolidated) captured the flag of the 39th Iowa Infantry. However, the Confederates were unable to capture the main Union fort, and were forced to withdraw. At Allatoona, the 1st and 4th Missouri (Consolidated) lost 5 men killed, 37 wounded, and 2 missing, for a total of 44. The regiment also participated in the Battle of Franklin on November 30, 1864. In Franklin, as at Allatoona, the 1st and 4th Missouri (Consolidated) was aligned as the second regiment from the left in Cockrell's brigade. Cockrell's brigade reached the main Union line near a cotton gin, where the brigade ran into very heavy fire. Cockrell was wounded during the charge, and command of the brigade fell to Colonel Elijah Gates of the 1st and 3rd Missouri Cavalry (Consolidated), who was also wounded, but remained with the unit.

The Confederates were able to break a hole in the Union line, but a strong counterattack drove the Confederates out of the main Union line. The First Missouri Brigade was decimated at Franklin, suffering 419 losses out of the 696 engaged in a frontal assault on the fortified Union lines. The 1st and 4th Missouri (Consolidated)'s commanding officer, Colonel Hugh A. Garland, was also killed in the charge. Garland had been carrying the regiment's flag when he fell; the flag was captured by Union troops. The regiment had entered the battle with around 100 men, and lost 35 of them killed, 25 wounded, and 2 missing, for a total of 62. The regiment, as well as the rest of the First Missouri Brigade, was on detached duty after Franklin, and missed the Battle of Nashville.

=== 1865 ===
After the failure of the Nashville campaign, the 1st and 4th Missouri (Consolidated) was ordered to Mobile, Alabama, where it participated in the defense of Fort Blakeley. During the Battle of Fort Blakeley on April 9, 1865, the Confederate defenses, including the 1st and 4th Missouri (Consolidated), were overrun by a strong Union assault. The Missourians were forced to surrender during the fall of the fort, and were sent to Ship Island, Mississippi as prisoners of war. The survivors of the regiment were paroled on May 13, while at Jackson, Mississippi; the war had ended for all effective purposes by that time.

== Commanders ==
The 1st and 4th Missouri (Consolidated) was commanded by Riley and Garland. Garland had served as lieutenant colonel for the regiment previously, and the consolidated regiment's majors were Garland and Bradford Keith.

== See also ==
- List of Missouri Confederate Civil War units
- 1st Missouri Infantry (Confederate)
- 4th Missouri Infantry (Confederate)

== Sources ==
- Gottschalk, Phil (1991). In Deadly Earnest: The Missouri Brigade. Columbia, Missouri: Missouri River Press. ISBN 0-9631136-1-5.
- Luvaas, Jay; Nelson, Harold W. (2008). Guide to the Atlanta Campaign: Rocky Face Ridge to Kennesaw Mountain. Lawrence, Kansas: University Press of Kansas. ISBN 978-0-7006-1570-4.
- McGhee, James E. (2008). Guide to Missouri Confederate Regiments, 1861–1865. Fayetteville, Arkansas: University of Arkansas Press. ISBN 978-1-55728-870-7.
- Tucker, Phillip Thomas (1993). The South's Finest: The First Missouri Confederate Brigade From Pea Ridge to Vicksburg. Shippensburg, Pennsylvania: White Mane Publishing Co. ISBN 0-942597-31-1.
