= 1st Missouri Cavalry Regiment (Confederate) =

- Flag of the 1st Missouri Cavalry
- Active: December, 1861 to May 13, 1865
- Country: Confederate States of America
- Allegiance: Missouri
- Branch: Confederate States Army
- Type: Cavalry
- Size: Regiment
- Engagements: American Civil War; *Battle of Pea Ridge; *Battle of Iuka; *Battle of Corinth; *Battle of Champion Hill; *Battle of Big Black River Bridge; *Siege of Vicksburg; *Atlanta campaign *Battle of Allatoona; *Battle of Franklin; *Battle of Fort Blakeley

Commanders
- Notable commanders: Colonel Elijah Gates

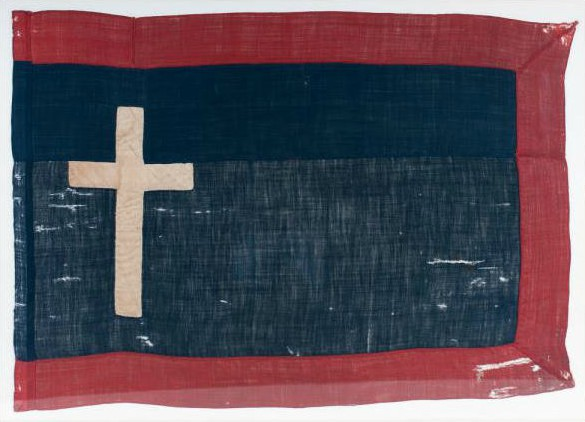
Original flag of the 1st Missouri Dismounted Cavalry (CSA)

The 1st Missouri Cavalry Regiment was a cavalry regiment that served in the Confederate States Army during the American Civil War.

== Organization ==
The regiment was formed in Missouri from December 5–31, 1861. Many of its members had served with the Missouri State Guard. The field officers were Colonel Elijah Gates, Lieutenant Colonels Richard B. Chiles, George W. Law, and William D. Maupin, and Majors Robert R. Lawther and William C. Parker.

- Company A - Captains Alexander P. Lamb, William Conklin, R. J. Early, James Johnston, and Joseph Henry Neal - Many men from Sac River, Holt County
- Company B - Captains George W. Law and William P. Gilbert - Many men from Sac River, Holt County
- Company C - Captains Lucien P. Johnson, George P. Gordon, Davis Lanter, and Hiram N. Upton - Many men from Sac River, Holt County
- Company D - Captains James Adams Lewis W. Chandler and J. E. Johnson - Many men from Springfield, Greene County
- Company E - Captains John S. Holland, Henry Clay McGee, James M. Garrett, Charles C. Haggerty, and John Stokely Olland - Many men from Sac River, Holt County Captain, also William Dunn, Downing, Missouri
- Company F - Captain John Thrailkill - Many men from Springfield, Greene County
- Company G - Captain Logan Enyart - Many men from Springfield, Greene County
- Company H - Captain John Patton - Many men from Springfield, Greene County
- Company I - Captains John N. Archer and Silas M. Gordon - Many men transferred from Missouri State Cavalry
- Company K - Captains L. J. Crocker and Harris Wilkerson - Many men from Sac River, Holt County

== Service ==
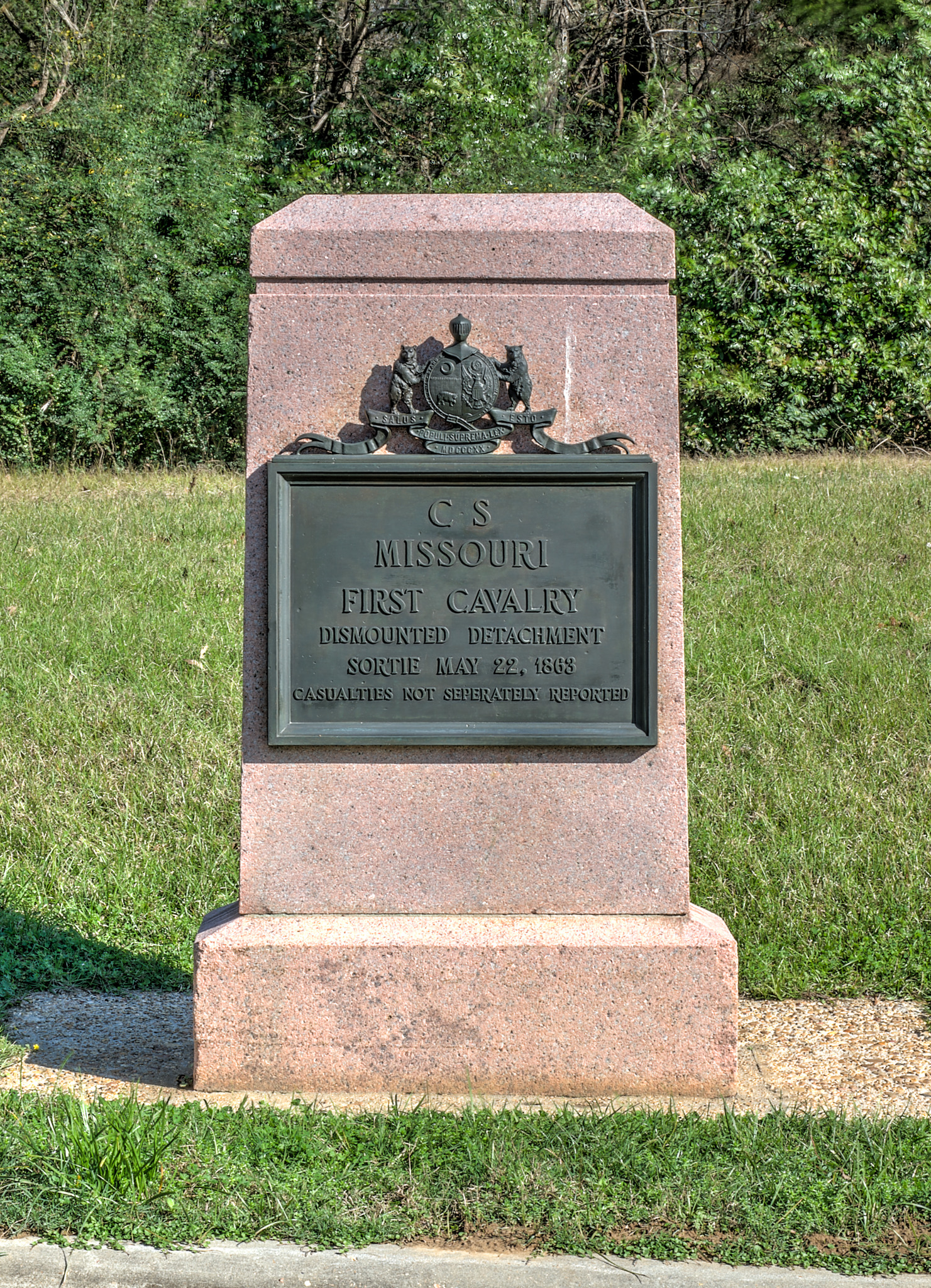
Memorial at Vicksburg National Military Park

The 1st Missouri Cavalry Regiment fought at the Battle of Pea Ridge, Arkansas from March 6–8, 1862, then moved east of the Mississippi River and was dismounted. On May 4, 1862, the regiment contained 536 effectives. After fighting at the Battle of Iuka, Mississippi on September 19, 1862, the regiment participated in the Battle of Corinth, Mississippi on October 3–4, 1862, where it lost 9 killed and 54 wounded. It was then assigned to Martin E. Green's Brigade, Department of Mississippi and East Louisiana. The regiment fought at the Battle of Champion Hill, Mississippi on May 16, 1863, and took an active part in the Battle of Big Black River Bridge on May 17. On July 4, 1863, it surrendered at the end of the Siege of Vicksburg. After being paroled, the regiment was declared exchanged on September 12, 1863. It was assigned to General Cockrell's Missouri Brigade, and consolidated with the 3rd (Samuel's) Missouri Cavalry Battalion. The 1st/3rd Battalion fought with the Army of Tennessee throughout the Atlanta campaign and reported 25 killed, 80 wounded, and 3 missing at its end. On October 5, 1864, the battalion saw action in the Battle of Allatoona, Georgia, where it sustained 56 casualties. In late 1864, it was part of Hood's operations in Tennessee, and fought at the Battle of Franklin on November 30. Later it was involved in the defense of Mobile, Alabama, fighting at the Battle of Fort Blakeley, Alabama from April 2–9, 1865. The small command surrendered with the Department of Alabama, Mississippi, and East Louisiana, and was disbanded on May 13, 1865.

== Commanders ==
- Colonel Elijah Gates - severely wounded at Franklin
- Lieutenant Colonel William D. Maupin - killed while commanding regiment at Second Corinth
- Major William C. Parker - commanded regiment during the siege of Vicksburg in 1863
- First Lieutenant Charles B. Cleveland - commanded battalion in December, 1864 after Colonel Gates was wounded at Franklin
- Captain Joseph H. Neal - commanded battalion at Fort Blakely in April, 1865

== Notable members ==
- Colonel Elijah Gates - Served as the State Treasurer of Missouri from 1877 to 1881.
- Private George Bent - Paroled in 1862 and returned to his Cheyenne relatives amongst his tribe. Survived the 1864 Sand Creek Massacre with his Cheyenne relatives. Fought with the Cheyenne Dog Soldiers against the U.S. Army during the subsequent Indian Wars.

== See also ==
- List of Missouri Confederate Civil War units
