= Perkins' Battalion =

Perkins' Battalion, Missouri Infantry
- Active: 1864 – May 1865
- Country: Confederate States of America
- Allegiance: Confederate States Army
- Branch: Infantry
- Type: Infantry / Partisan Battalion
- Size: 6 Companies (437 men tracked on roster)
- Part of: Trans-Mississippi Department
- Engagements: American Civil War * Price's Missouri Expedition

Commanders
- Current commander: Colonel Caleb Perkins

Perkins' Battalion, Missouri Infantry was an infantry battalion that served in the Confederate States Army during the American Civil War. Organized behind enemy lines late in the conflict by Colonel Caleb Perkins, the unit operated as a highly fluid infantry and recruiting asset during major campaigns.

== Organization ==
The battalion officially comprised six distinct active companies (Companies A through F). The unit's historical roster tracked by the National Park Service lists 437 individual men who served across the duration of the command's existence. The soldiers were primarily recruited from northern and central Missouri counties by authorized officers working in territory heavily monitored by Federal forces.

== History ==
Organized under direct recruitment authorities granted by Major General Sterling Price, Colonel Perkins and his subordinates (including Company C Captain G.W. "Wash" Bryson) gathered partisan components across the state in 1864. Operating alongside regional partisan forces like those of Clifton Holtzclaw, the battalion utilized guerrilla tactics to disrupt Union logistical lines, attack outposts, and secure routes for regular forces. The battalion provided critical scouting and auxiliary manpower support to main Confederate columns during Price's Missouri Expedition in the fall of 1864. Following the retreat of Price's forces from the state, Perkins' Battalion continued localized resistance movements until surrendering to Union forces for final parole in May 1865.

== See also ==
- List of Confederate units from Missouri in the American Civil War
