= 4th Missouri Infantry Regiment (Confederate) =

Infantry regiment of the Confederate States Army

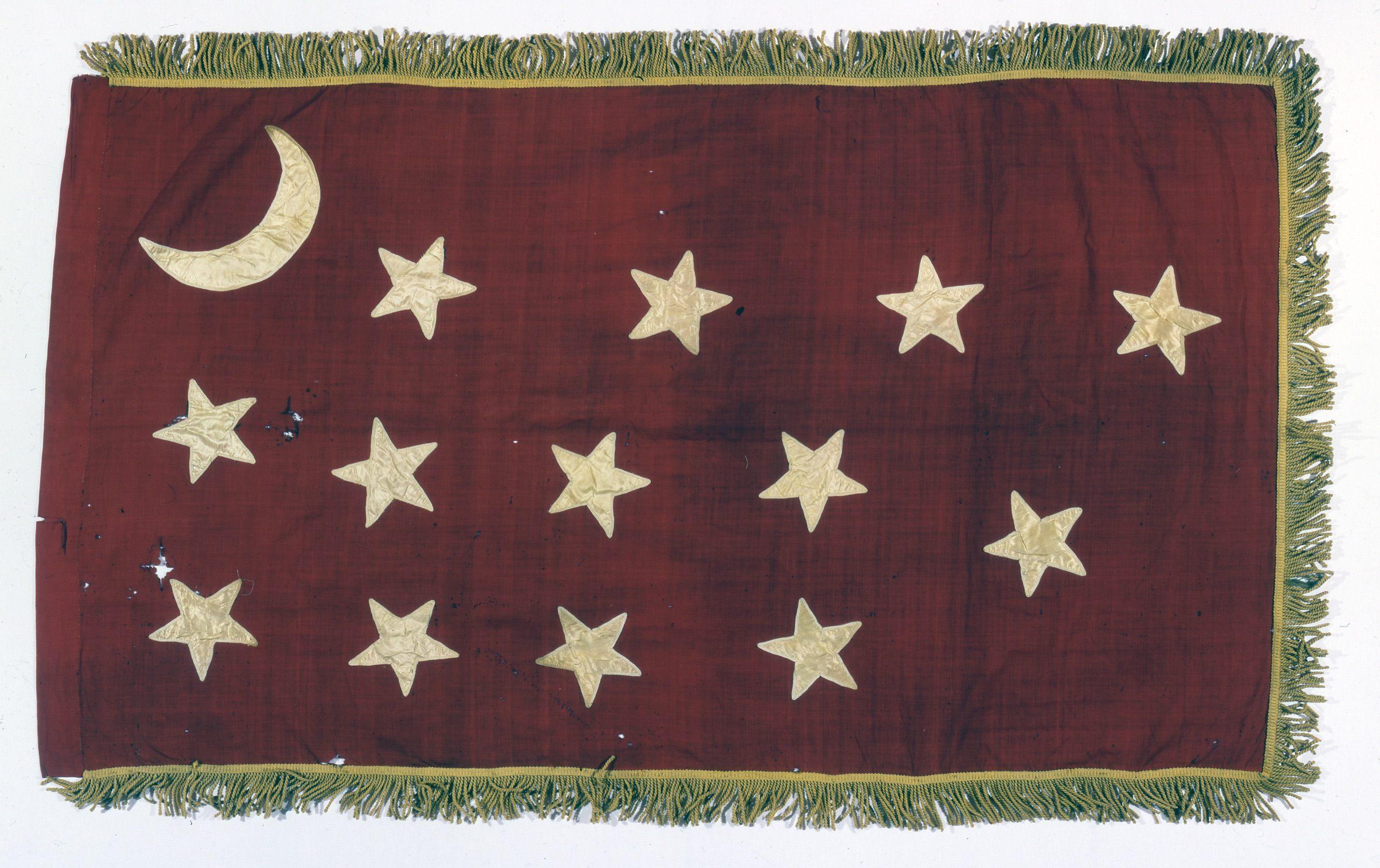
- Regimental color of the Fourth Missouri at the American Civil War Museum in Richmond, Virginia
- Active: April–November 1862
- Disbanded: November 7, 1862
- Country: Confederate States
- Allegiance: Missouri
- Branch: Army
- Type: Infantry
- Size: Regiment
- Facings: Light blue
- Battles: American Civil War; Battle of Corinth

The 4th Missouri Infantry Regiment was formed on April 28, 1862, and served in the Confederate States Army during the American Civil War. The infantry regiment did not see action at the Battle of Farmington on May 9, and the Battle of Iuka on September 19 despite being part of the Confederate force present at those battles. As part of Brigadier General Martin E. Green's brigade, the regiment participated in three charges against Union lines on October 3, 1862, during the Second Battle of Corinth. The following day, the regiment, along with the rest of Green's brigade, attacked the new Union lines. Despite initial success, the attack was repulsed by a Union counterattack. The regiment ceased to exist as a separate unit when it was combined with the 1st Missouri Infantry Regiment on November 7, 1862, to form the 1st and 4th Missouri Infantry Regiment (Consolidated).

The combined unit served in the Vicksburg campaign in 1863, before surrendering at the end of the siege of Vicksburg. After undergoing a prisoner exchange, the men rejoined the Confederate Army and served in the Atlanta campaign and the Battle of Franklin in 1864, still as part of the 1st and 4th Missouri Infantry Regiment (Consolidated). On May 9, 1865, near the end of the war, the consolidated regiment surrendered during the Battle of Fort Blakeley, ending the unit's existence. The 4th Missouri Infantry's battle flag is displayed at the American Civil War Museum.

== Background and organization ==
When the American Civil War began in 1861, the state of Missouri was politically divided between those supporting secession and those wishing to remain in the Union. The Governor of Missouri, Claiborne Fox Jackson, was a secessionist and supported the Confederate States of America; he created a pro-secession militia unit known as the Missouri State Guard (MSG) in May. The MSG, under the command of Major General Sterling Price, had initial success, including a victory against the Union Army in the Battle of Wilson's Creek, but were confined to southwestern Missouri by the end of the year. In the Battle of Pea Ridge, fought on March 7 and 8, 1862, in northwestern Arkansas, Price and the MSG suffered another defeat while serving under Major General Earl Van Dorn. After Pea Ridge, Van Dorn's army was transferred east of the Mississippi River. Eventually, many of the men of the MSG joined Confederate Army units.

The 4th Missouri Infantry Regiment was formed on April 28, 1862, in Memphis, Tennessee. Two previously existing battalions, commanded by Archibald A. MacFarlane and Waldo P. Johnson, were combined with a small element of the MSG; many of MacFarlane and Johnson's men were MSG veterans. MacFarlane was appointed the regiment's first colonel, Johnson was the first lieutenant colonel, and Stephen W. Wood was the regiment's first major. On April 28, the regiment contained ten companies, all Missouri-raised; they were designated with the letters A–I and K. Almost all of the regiment's soldiers were of Anglo-Saxon descent.

== Service history ==
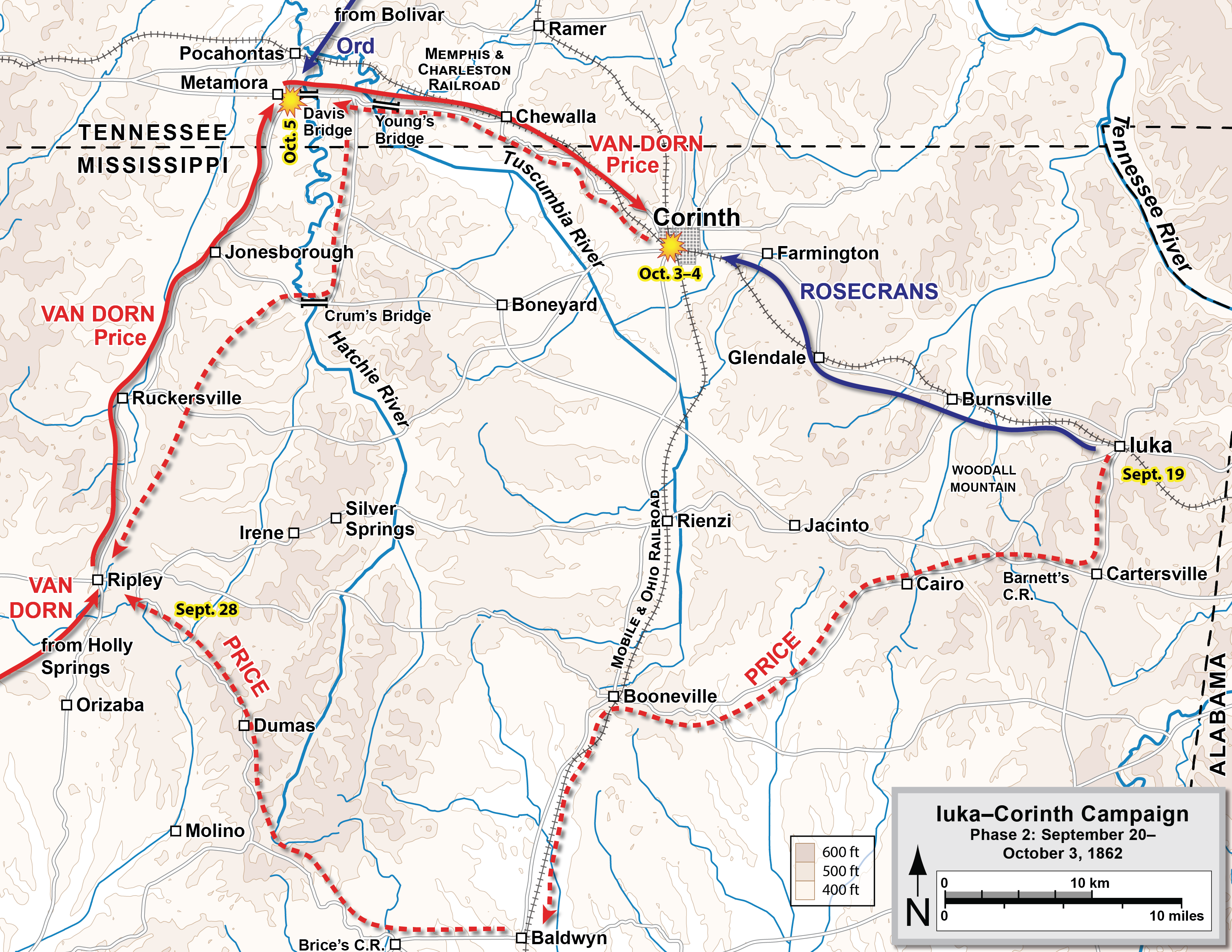
Map of the Iuka–Corinth campaign

After formation, the regiment was transferred by railroad to Corinth, Mississippi, as part of the Army of the West. An accounting of the regiment's troops during a May 5, 1862 muster listed 547 men in the regiment. On May 9, the 4th Missouri Infantry was near the action at the Battle of Farmington and deployed, but did not enter the fray. After the Confederates evacuated Corinth because of Union pressure, the regiment trained in several locations in northern Mississippi. Price was in command of the Army of the West, which he had stationed at Iuka, Mississippi; Van Dorn had troops further to the south. The Confederates were conducting an offensive into Kentucky, and Price and Van Dorn were expected to move into Tennessee to support it. Major General Ulysses S. Grant, who was the Union commander in the region, attempted to trap Price before he could join Van Dorn, but the Confederates were able to escape after fighting the Battle of Iuka. At this time, the 4th Missouri Infantry was in Brigadier General Martin E. Green's brigade, which was held in reserve and did not fight at Iuka.

After escaping, Price joined Van Dorn, who commanded the combined force. Together, the Confederates moved against Corinth, which was strategically important to Union plans in the region. On October 2, Union Major General William S. Rosecrans occupied Corinth with 23,000 men; that same day, he learned of Van Dorn's approach. After arriving near the city, the Confederates deployed in an arc northwest of the Union defenses with 22,000 men. At 10:00 a.m. on October 3, Van Dorn attacked, beginning the Second Battle of Corinth. At Corinth, the 4th Missouri Infantry was still part of Green's brigade, which was in Brigadier General Louis Hébert's division; Hébert's formation was, in turn, part of Price's corps within the Army of West Tennessee. The 4th Missouri Infantry and the rest of Green's brigade (except for the artillery) attacked an outer Union position held by Brigadier General Thomas A. Davies's division. The initial attack was repulsed, but Green ordered a second charge, which was again repulsed, this time by a Union counterattack led by the 2nd Iowa Infantry. Later in the afternoon, Green's brigade made another charge against Davies's line; this attack was supported by elements of Colonel Elijah Gates's and Brigadier General Charles W. Phifer's brigades. After heavy fighting, the Union line was broken. Despite an opportunity to attack the inner Union line, Price decided not to press the attack as only 30 minutes of daylight remained; instead, he waited for the morning of the 4th to resume the battle.

After Hébert fell ill, Green was promoted to divisional command on October 4. Command of Green's brigade then fell to Colonel William H. Moore, who led a charge against the inner Union line, to capture a fortification known as Battery Powell. The Union line was defended by men of Davies's division, who were quickly routed by the Confederate charge. After breaking through Davies's line, Moore's brigade aimed for the town of Corinth itself. Along with elements of Phifer's brigade and the brigade of Brigadier General John C. Moore, it entered Corinth and penetrated as far as the Tishomingo Hotel. A Union counterattack drove the Confederates out of Corinth. At Second Corinth, the 4th Missouri lost 129 men: 15 killed, 87 wounded, and 27 missing. MacFarlane suffered a serious head wound during the battle.

== Legacy ==
On November 7, in the vicinity of Wyatt, Mississippi, the regiment consolidated with the 1st Missouri Infantry, due to losses in both units. The combination of the two regiments formed the 1st and 4th Missouri Infantry Regiment (Consolidated). Companies B, C, E, H, and I of the new regiment were composed of men from the 4th Missouri Infantry; Companies A, D, F, G, and K were composed of men from the 1st Missouri Infantry. MacFarlane and Colonel Amos C. Riley of the 1st Missouri Infantry came to an agreement whereby McFarlane became colonel of the unit and Riley lieutenant colonel; the latter commanded the unit while MacFarlane recovered from his wounds. As a result of the consolidation, about 40 officers were deemed superfluous and were sent back across the Mississippi River to recruit new soldiers.

In 1863, the new regiment fought at the Battle of Grand Gulf, the Battle of Champion Hill, the Battle of Big Black River Bridge, and the siege of Vicksburg, where the regiment was captured as part of a Confederate surrender. The men of the regiment then underwent a prisoner exchange and rejoined the Confederate army, still under the designation of the 1st and 4th Missouri Infantry Regiment (Consolidated). In 1864, the regiment was engaged at the Battle of New Hope Church, the Battle of Kennesaw Mountain, the siege of Atlanta, the Battle of Allatoona, and the Battle of Franklin. On May 9, 1865, near the end of the war, the 1st and 4th Missouri Infantry (Consolidated) surrendered at the Battle of Fort Blakeley, ending the unit's existence.

As of January 2021, the flag of the 4th Missouri Infantry, a Van Dorn battle flag, is held by the American Civil War Museum in Richmond, Virginia.

== See also ==
- List of Missouri Confederate Civil War units

== Sources ==
- Cozzens, Peter (1997). The Darkest Days of the War: The Battles of Iuka and Corinth. Chapel Hill, North Carolina: University of North Carolina Press. ISBN 978-0-8078-2320-0.
- Dedmondt, Glenn (2009). The Flags of Civil War Arkansas. Gretna, Louisiana: Pelican Publishing Company. ISBN 978-1-58980-190-5.
- Gottschalk, Phil (1991). In Deadly Earnest: The Missouri Brigade. Columbia, Missouri: Missouri River Press. ISBN 978-0-9631136-1-0.
- Hatcher, Richard (1998). "Wilson's Creek, Missouri". In Kennedy, Frances H. (ed.). The Civil War Battlefield Guide (2nd ed.). Boston/New York: Houghton Mifflin. ISBN 978-0-395-74012-5.
- Kennedy, Frances H., ed. (1998). The Civil War Battlefield Guide (2nd ed.). Boston/New York: Houghton Mifflin. ISBN 978-0-395-74012-5.
- McGhee, James E. (2008). Guide to Missouri Confederate Regiments, 1861–1865. Fayetteville, Arkansas: University of Arkansas Press. ISBN 978-1-55728-870-7.
- Reaves, George A. (1998). "Corinth, Mississippi". In Kennedy, Frances H. (ed.). The Civil War Battlefield Guide (2nd ed.). Boston/New York: Houghton Mifflin. ISBN 978-0-395-74012-5.
- Shea, William L.; Hess, Earl J. (1998). "Pea Ridge, Arkansas". In Kennedy, Frances H. (ed.). The Civil War Battlefield Guide (2nd ed.). Boston/New York: Houghton Mifflin. ISBN 978-0-395-74012-5.
- Tucker, Phillip Thomas (1993). The South's Finest: The First Missouri Confederate Brigade From Pea Ridge to Vicksburg. Shippensburg, Pennsylvania: White Mane Publishing Co. ISBN 978-0-942597-31-8.
