= 1st Missouri Infantry Regiment (Confederate) =

Infantry regiment of the Confederate States Army

1st Missouri Infantry (Confederate)
- National flag of the regiment
- Active: June 22, 1861 to November 7, 1862
- Allegiance: Confederate States of America
- Branch: Confederate States Army
- Type: Infantry
- Engagements: Battle of Shiloh; Second Battle of Corinth

The 1st Missouri Infantry was an infantry regiment that served in the Confederate States Army during the American Civil War. Originally commanded by Colonel John S. Bowen, the regiment fought at the Battle of Shiloh, where it was engaged near the Peach Orchard on April 6, 1862. On April 7, during the Union counterattacks at Shiloh, the regiment was instrumental in preventing the Washington Artillery from being captured. The regiment was next engaged at the Second Battle of Corinth, where it outflanked several Union positions. On the second day at Corinth, the regiment was only minimally engaged. On November 7, the 1st Missouri Infantry was combined with the 4th Missouri Infantry to form the 1st and 4th Missouri Infantry (Consolidated), as a result of heavy battle losses in both regiments.

== Organization ==
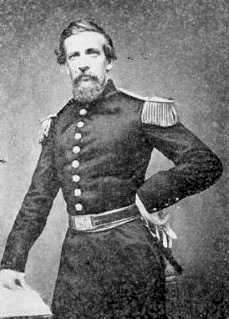
John S. Bowen, first colonel of the regiment

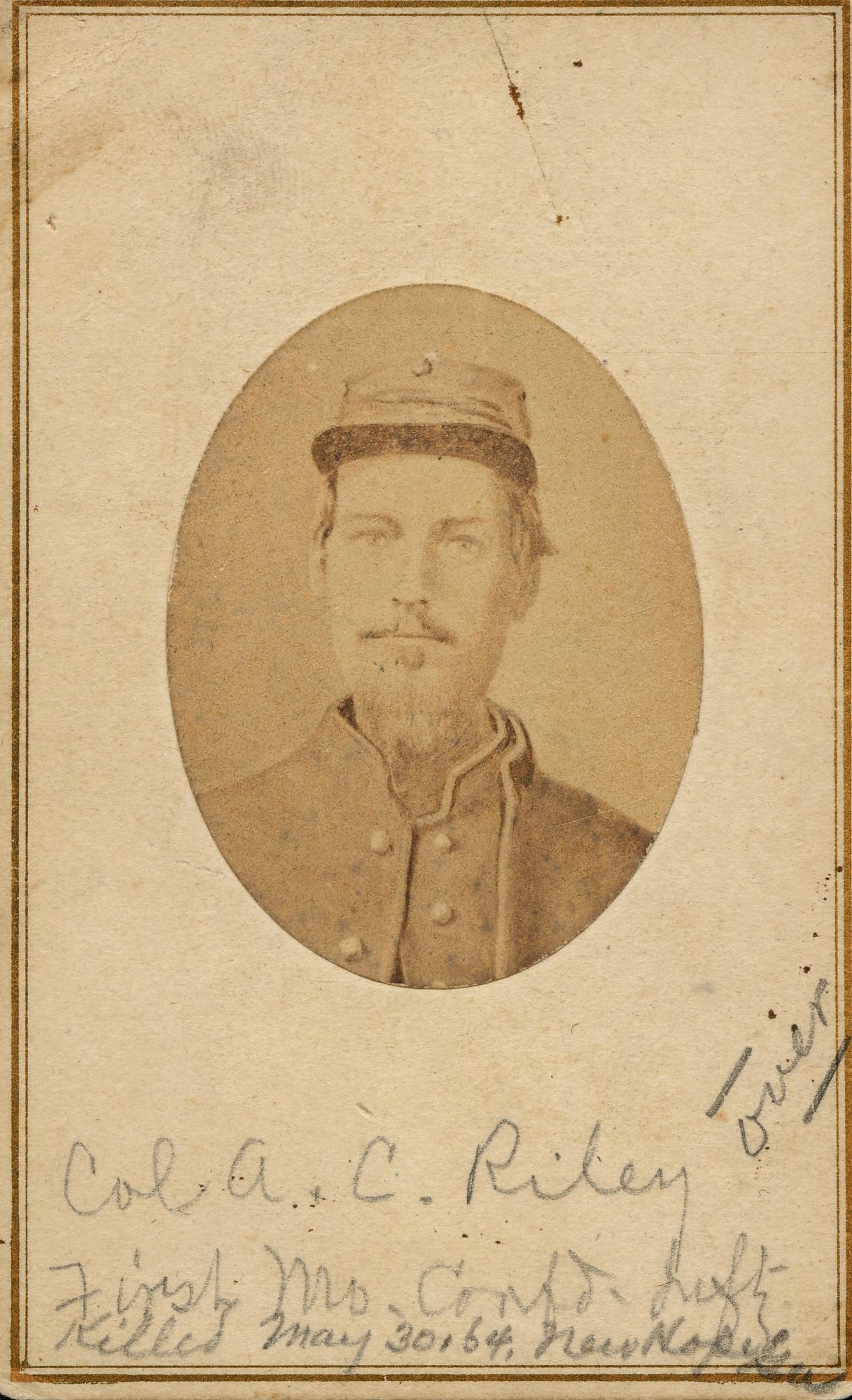
Col. Amos Camden Riley

The regiment was the first Missouri unit to officially enter the Confederate States Army. After recruiting efforts by Colonel John S. Bowen, who had been captured during the Camp Jackson affair, in early June 1861, the unit was officially mustered on June 22, near Memphis, Tennessee. Bowen was the regiment's first colonel, Lucius L. Rich was appointed the first lieutenant colonel, and Charles C. Campbell was the first major. Some of the men recruited were from outside of Missouri, including many from Memphis and New Orleans, Louisiana. Most of the Missourians were from St. Louis or the Missouri Bootheel area. The company organization at the date of organization was:

- Company A: New Orleans, Louisiana and St. Louis, Missouri. Commanded by J. Kemp Sprague
- Company B: St. Louis, Missouri. Commanded by Robert J. Duffy
- Company C: Memphis, Tennessee, and St. Louis, Missouri. Commanded by David Hirsch. (Note: The original Company C was combined with Company F at an unknown date, a new Company C was later organized.)
- Company D: St. Louis, Missouri. Commanded by Martin Burke
- Company E: Mississippi County, Missouri, New Madrid County, Missouri, and St. Louis, Missouri. Commanded by Olin F. Rice
- Company F: St. Louis, Missouri. Commanded by Hugh A. Garland Jr.
- Company G: Pemiscot County, Missouri. Commanded by John A. Gordon.
- Company H: New Madrid County, Missouri, and Pemiscot County, Missouri. Commanded by Tilford Hogan.
- Company I: New Madrid County, Missouri. Commanded by Thomas J. Phillips.
- Company K: Pemiscot County, Missouri. Commanded by John E. Averill.

== Service ==
=== 1861 ===
In August 1861, the regiment was transferred from the Memphis area to New Madrid, Missouri, where it was part of the force of Brigadier General Gideon Pillow. While at New Madrid, the regiment became known for its skill at drill. In September, the unit was again transferred, this time to Columbus, Kentucky. The regiment was issued weapons on September 23. In late December, the regiment was sent to Bowling Green, Kentucky.

=== 1862 ===
==== Shiloh ====
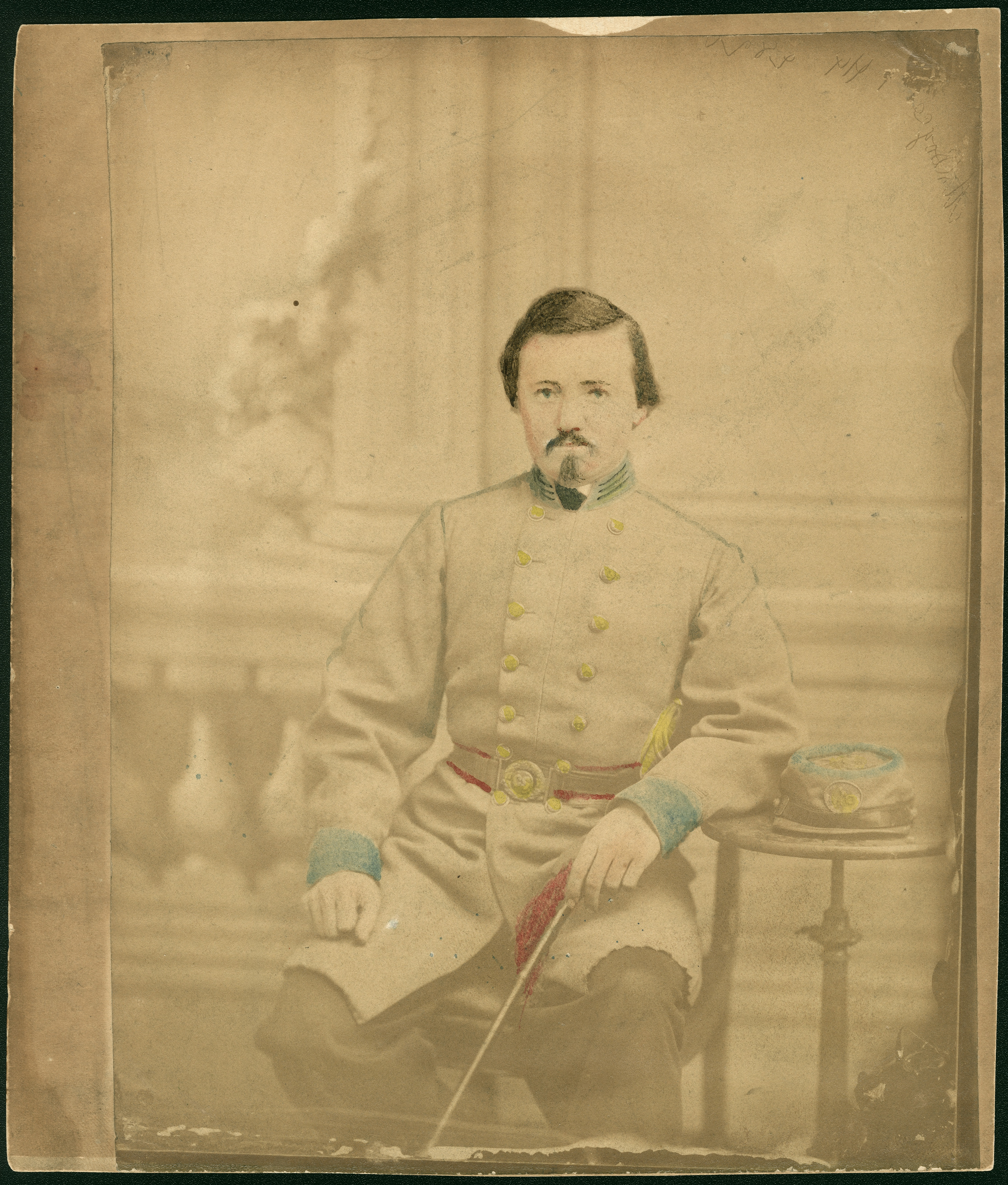
Joseph Boyce of the St. Louis Greys, 1st Missouri Infantry

After the Battle of Fort Donelson in early 1862, the regiment participated in the destruction of Confederate property during the abandonment of Nashville, Tennessee. The 1st Missouri then joined General Albert Sidney Johnston's Army of Mississippi. The regiment was stationed at Corinth, Mississippi, for some time. Bowen was promoted to brigadier general on March 14, and was replaced as regimental commander by Lieutenant Colonel Rich, who was officially promoted to colonel on April 1. In early April 1862, the 1st Missouri was part of Brigadier General John C. Breckinridge's Reserve Corps of Johnston's army, and would be in Bowen's brigade along with the 9th Arkansas Infantry, 10th Arkansas Infantry, 2nd Confederate Infantry, Hudson's Mississippi Battery, Watson's Louisiana Battery, and a company of Kentucky cavalry.

On April 6, the first day of the Battle of Shiloh, the 1st Missouri and the rest of Bowen's brigade attacked a Union defensive position known as the Peach Orchard. After heavy fighting, the Confederate charge drove the Union troops from the Peach Orchard, although Johnston was mortally wounded during the fighting. On April 7, the 1st Missouri participated in the Confederate defense against Union counterattacks, and played a significant role in preventing the capture of a portion of the Washington Artillery. Eventually, the Confederate army retreated from the battlefield, and the 1st Missouri was part of the army's rear guard on the march back to Corinth. At Shiloh, the regiment lost 48 men killed, 130 wounded, and 29 missing, for a total of 207; the regiment had begun the battle with around 850 men. Colonel Rich had been wounded on April 6; he died on August 9. Lieutenant Colonel Amos Camden Riley replaced Rich at the head of the regiment; Riley was officially promoted to colonel on August 2.

==== Corinth ====
After the Confederates abandoned Corinth in the summer of 1862, the 1st Missouri was transferred to the Vicksburg, Mississippi, area. The regiment, as well as the rest of Bowen's brigade, was expected to be part of the Confederate assault at the Battle of Baton Rouge, but arrived too late for the fighting. By early October, the 1st Missouri was part of Major General Earl van Dorn's Army of West Tennessee. The regiment was part of Bowen's brigade of Major General Mansfield Lovell's division. Bowen's brigade also contained the 6th Mississippi Infantry, 15th Mississippi Infantry, 22nd Mississippi Infantry, Caruther's Mississippi Battalion, and Watson's Louisiana Battery. On October 3, at the Second Battle of Corinth, the 1st Missouri was part of the Confederate assault on the Union's outer defensive works. The 1st Missouri, along with the 33rd Mississippi Infantry, broke the line of the 15th Michigan Infantry, contributing to the collapse of the initial Union line. During the fighting, the 1st Missouri became separated from the rest of Bowen's brigade, and fought with the brigade of Brigadier General John C. Moore for the rest of the day. The 1st Missouri outflanked a Union position commanded by Brigadier General John McArthur, helping Moore's brigade break the line. Moore's brigade then ran against Union reinforcements commanded by Colonel Marcellus Crocker. The 1st Missouri outflanked the 15th Iowa Infantry, which, accompanied by Moore's primary assault on Crocker's line, led to the collapse of the Union position. However, Moore's brigade was not reinforced, and the Confederate assault died down. The next day, Bowen's brigade was only briefly engaged during Confederate attacks on the stronger interior Union position, as Lovell's division was mostly inactive on October 4.

The regiment reported a total loss of seven men at Corinth, although historian James McGhee believes this total is incomplete. The 1st Missouri was part of the Confederate rear guard after Corinth, and participated in skirmishing. On November 7, the 1st Missouri and the 4th Missouri Infantry were combined, as both regiments had suffered heavy losses. The new regiment was known as the 1st and 4th Missouri Infantry (Consolidated). After the consolidation, the Missourians joined the First Missouri Brigade. Colonel Riley commanded the new regiment. Companies A, D, F, G, and K of the 1st and 4th (Consolidated) were from the 1st Missouri, while Companies B, C, E, H, and I were from the 4th.

== Legacy ==
The 1st and 4th Missouri Infantry (Consolidated), which contained many men from the 1st, was assigned to the First Missouri Brigade. The new regiment was engaged in several battles in the 1863 Vicksburg campaign, including the Battle of Champion Hill. In 1864, the regiment fought at the battles of New Hope Church and Kennesaw Mountain in the Atlanta campaign, and saw further action at the Battle of Allatoona. After suffering heavy casualties at the Battle of Franklin, the regiment was transferred to Mobile, Alabama, where it surrendered at the Battle of Fort Blakeley on April 9.

Over the life of the regiment before the consolidation, about 1,045 men fought in the regiment; 338 of the regiment's men died while serving with the regiment. Of the deaths, 141 were related to combat.

== Commanders ==
Before the consolidation with the 4th Missouri, the 1st Missouri was commanded by Colonels Bowen, Rich, and Riley. Rich and Riley also served as lieutenant colonels before their promotions. Campbell and Garland were the regiment's majors. After the consolidation, the 1st and 4th Missouri (Consolidated) was commanded by Riley and Garland. Garland had served as lieutenant colonel for the regiment previously, and the consolidated regiment's majors were Garland and Bradford Keith.

== See also ==
- List of Missouri Confederate Civil War units
- 1st and 4th Missouri Infantry (Consolidated)
- 4th Missouri Infantry (Confederate)
- List of Missouri Union Civil War units

== Sources ==
- Cozzens, Peter (1997). The Darkest Days of the War: The Battles of Iuka and Corinth. Chapel Hill, North Carolina: University of North Carolina Press. ISBN 0-8078-2320-1.
- Cunningham, O. Edward (2007). Shiloh and the Western Campaign of 1862. New York: Savas Beatie. ISBN 978-1-932714-27-2.
- McGhee, James E. (2008). Guide to Missouri Confederate Regiments, 1861–1865. Fayetteville, Arkansas: University of Arkansas Press. ISBN 978-1-55728-870-7.
