= 1876 Missouri State Treasurer election =

- November 7, 1876
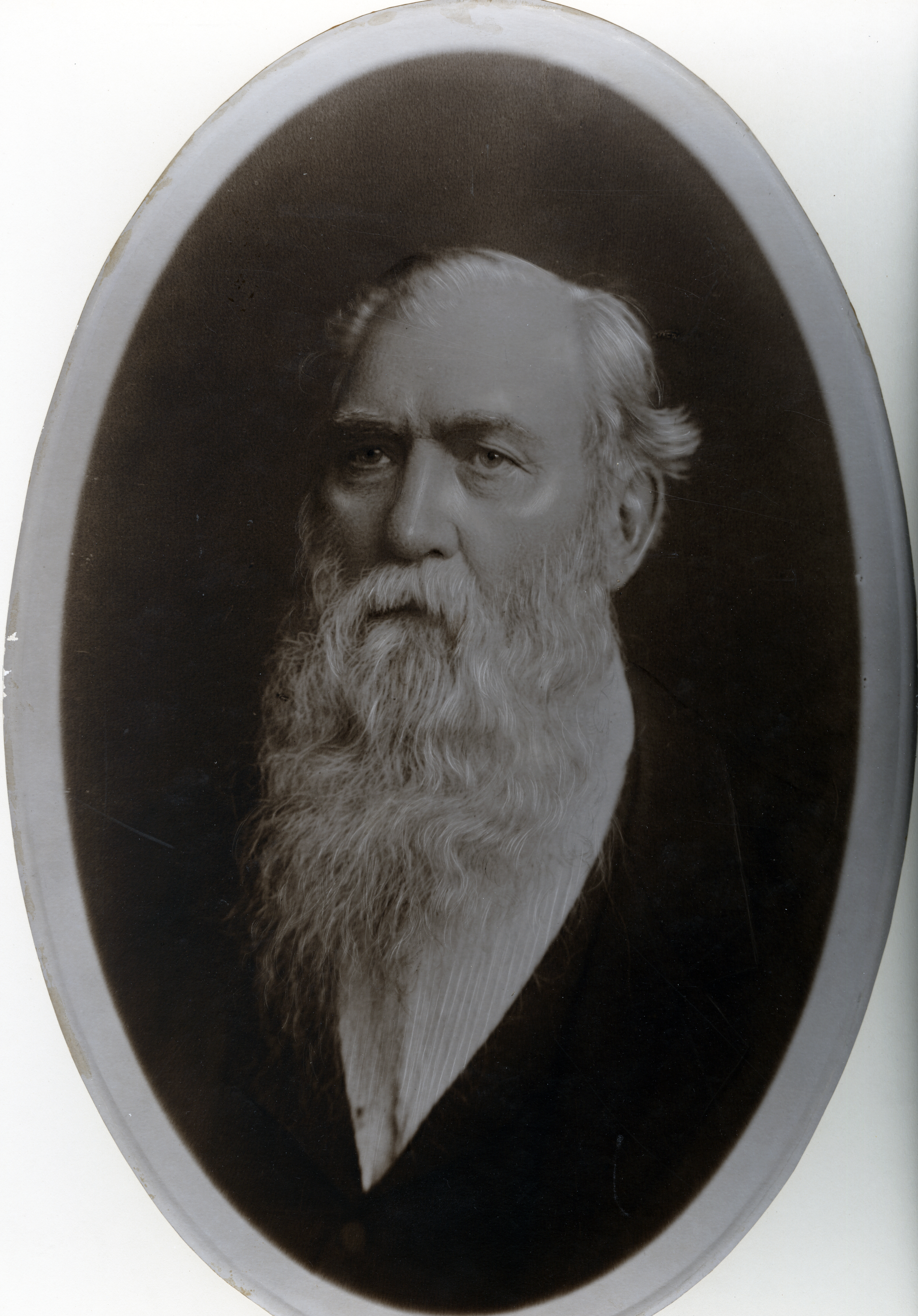

Nominee	Elijah Gates	John Severance
Party	Democratic	Republican
Popular vote	203,854	145,244
Percentage	58.39%	41.61%
State Treasurer before election
Joseph Wayne Mercer
Democratic
Elected State Treasurer
Elijah Gates
Democratic

The 1876 Missouri State Treasurer election was held on November 7, 1876, in order to elect the state treasurer of Missouri. Democratic nominee Elijah Gates defeated Republican nominee John Severance.

== General election ==
On election day, November 7, 1876, Democratic nominee Elijah Gates won the election by a margin of 58,610 votes against his opponent Republican nominee John Severance, thereby retaining Democratic control over the office of state treasurer. Gates was sworn in as the 14th state treasurer of Missouri on January 8, 1877.

=== Results ===
Missouri State Treasurer election, 1876
Party	Candidate	Votes	%
Democratic	Elijah Gates	203,854	58.39
Republican	John Severance	145,244	41.61
Total votes		349,098	100.00
Democratic hold			

== See also ==
- 1876 Missouri gubernatorial election
