= Searcy's Battalion =

Searcy's Battalion, Missouri Sharpshooters
- Active: 1864 – May 1865
- Country: Confederate States of America
- Allegiance: Confederate States Army
- Branch: Infantry / Sharpshooters
- Type: Sharpshooters / Light Infantry
- Size: Battalion (understrength)
- Part of: Tyler's Brigade / Trans-Mississippi Department
- Engagements: American Civil War: Price's Missouri Expedition; Battle of Westport

Commanders
- Notable commanders: Colonel James Jasper Searcy

Searcy's Battalion, Missouri Sharpshooters was a specialized light infantry battalion that served in the Confederate States Army during the American Civil War. Originally organized as a full cavalry regiment, the unit suffered heavy attrition, leading to its conversion into a dismounted sharpshooter battalion late in the war.

== History ==
The unit was initially raised behind Union lines in Missouri as Searcy's Regiment Missouri Cavalry, under the command of Colonel James Jasper Searcy. Following months of heavy skirmishing and logistics problems in the Trans-Mississippi theater, the regiment's effective field numbers dropped significantly under strength. In 1864, Confederate authorities officially dismounted the remaining troopers and downgraded the command structure into a designated battalion of sharpshooters.

== Price's Missouri Expedition ==
The battalion participated heavily in Major General Sterling Price's 1864 expedition into Missouri. Due to weapon shortages across the army, elements of Searcy's Battalion were heavily incorporated alongside Tyler's Brigade of unarmed recruits to provide foundational support during movements. The battalion saw active service during the retreat actions of the campaign, including the Battle of Westport on October 23, 1864. Records indicate the command suffered severe weather hardships, freezing temperatures, and collapsing rations during the subsequent retreat south across the Arkansas River, causing several detachments to disperse or be captured by local Federal garrisons.

== Disbandment ==
The remnants of the battalion continued operating in the outer Trans-Mississippi sectors until the end of hostilities. Surviving elements of the battalion, including members of Company C, surrendered to Union authorities at New Orleans and were officially paroled at Alexandria, Louisiana, on June 7, 1865.

== See also ==
- List of Confederate units from Missouri in the American Civil War
