= Flag of the Army of the West =

1862 Confederate battle flag

Army of the West
- Van Dorn flag
- Use: War flag
- Adopted: March 4, 1862
- Relinquished: September 28, 1862
- Design: A rectangular field of red depicting a white crescent moon and 13 white stars; and trimmed with gold cord.
- Designed by: Maj. Gen. Earl Van Dorn

The flag of the Army of the West, often referred to as the Van Dorn flag, was the flag of the Army of the West in 1862. The army was composed of Confederate troops from Arkansas and Missouri.

== Design ==
The flag is a rectangular field of red depicting a white crescent moon and 13 white stars; and trimmed with gold cord. The 13 stars symbolize thirteen Confederate states, to include Kentucky and Missouri.

== History ==
In the spring of 1862, Confederate Major-General Earl Van Dorn, the commanding officer of the Army of the West, ordered all regiments under his command use the flag pattern as a regimental color. The Army of the West was originally composed of Confederate troops from Arkansas and Missouri located in Northwest Arkansas. The 4th Missouri and 15th Arkansas infantry regiments carried it into battle, as well as several other regiments merged into the Army of Mississippi and East Louisiana.
