= Kenneth W. Noe =

American historian (born 1957)

Kenneth W. Noe is an American historian whose primary interests are the American Civil War, Appalachia and the American South. He has most recently published Abraham Lincoln and the Heroic Legend: Reconsidering Lincoln as Commander in Chief.

Born in Richmond, Virginia in 1957, he grew up in Elliston, Virginia. He received his B.A. from Emory & Henry College in 1979, M.A. from Virginia Tech in 1981, M.S.L.S. from the University of Kentucky in 1983 and his Ph.D. from the University of Illinois in 1990. He was a finalist for the Lincoln Prize, and twice a Pulitzer Prize entrant, for his books Perryville: This Grand Havoc of Battle, and The Howling Storm. He taught at the University of West Georgia from 1990 until 2000, and moved to Auburn University. In 2021 he retired from Auburn as the Draughon Professor of Southern History.

== Bibliography ==
- Kenneth W. Noe (2026). Abraham Lincoln and the Heroic Legend: Reconsidering Lincoln as Commander in Chief. Baton Rouge, LA: Louisiana State University Press. ISBN 9780807185216.
- Kenneth W. Noe (2021). The Howling Storm: Weather, Climate, and the American Civil War. Baton Rouge, LA: Louisiana State University Press. ISBN 978-0-8071-7320-6. Pulitzer Prize Entrant, 2020; Gilder Lehrman Lincoln Prize Finalist, 2021
- Kenneth W. Noe, ed. (2013). The Yellowhammer War: The Civil War and Reconstruction in Alabama. Tuscaloosa, AL: University of Alabama Press. ISBN 978-0-8173-1808-6.
- Kenneth W. Noe (2010). Reluctant Rebels: The Confederates Who Joined the Army after 1861. Chapel Hill, NC: University of North Carolina Press. ISBN 978-0-8078-3377-3.
- Daniel McDonough and Kenneth W. Noe, ed. (2006). Politics and Culture of the Civil War Era: Essays in Honor of Robert W. Johannsen. Seligsgrove, PA: Susquehanna University Press. ISBN 1-57591-101-9.
- Kenneth W. Noe (2001). Perryville: This Grand Havoc of Battle. Lexington: University Press of Kentucky. ISBN 0-8131-2209-0. History Book Club Alternate Selection, 2001; Pulitzer Prize Entrant, 2001; Peter Seaborg Book Award for Civil War Non-Fiction, 2002; Kentucky Governor's Award, 2003
- Kenneth W. Noe and Shannon H. Wilson, ed. (1997). The Civil War in Appalachia: Collected Essays. Knoxville: University of Tennessee Press. ISBN 1-57233-269-7.
- Kenneth W. Noe, ed. (1996). A Southern Boy in Blue: The Memoir of Marcus Woodcock, 9th Kentucky Infantry (U. S. A.). Knoxville: University of Tennessee Press. ISBN 1-57233-126-7.Tennessee History Book Award, 1997
- Kenneth W. Noe (1994). Southwest Virginia's Railroad: Modernization and the Sectional Crisis. Urbana: University of Illinois Press. ISBN 0-252-02070-7.
