= Polk (name) =

Polk is a surname and given name which may refer to:

== Surname ==
- Albert F. Polk (1869–1955), American lawyer and politician
- Antoinette Van Leer Polk, Baroness de Charette (1847–1919), American Southern belle and French aristocrat by marriage
- Aysia Polk (born 1990), American actress
- Benjamin Polk (1916–2001), American designer and architect
- Carlos Polk (born 1977), American retired National Football League player
- Charles Polk Jr. (1788–1857), American farmer and politician
- Chris Polk (born 1989), American football running back
- DaShon Polk (born 1977), American football player
- Doug Polk (born 1988), American professional poker player
- Elias Polk (1806–1886), American slave and political activist
- Ezekiel Polk (1747–1824), American surveyor, soldier, pioneer and grandfather to United States president James K. Polk
- Frank Polk (1871–1943), American lawyer
- George Polk (1913–1948), American journalist murdered in Greece
- Grace Porterfield Polk (1875–1965), American singer, songwriter, composer and clubwoman
- Hiram Polk (born 1936), American surgeon and thoroughbred horse racing enthusiast
- Ja'Lynn Polk (born 2002), American football player
- James G. Polk (1896–1959), American politician
- James H. Polk (1911–1992), American four-star general
- James K. Polk (1795–1849), 11th president of the United States of America
- John A. Polk (1949–2026), American politician from Mississippi
- John C. Polk (died 1877), American politician from Maryland
- Leonidas Polk (1806–1864), American bishop, Confederate general and planter
- Leonidas L. Polk (1837–1892), American farmer, journalist and politician
- Lucius Junius Polk (1802–1870), American politician and planter
- Lucy Ann Polk (1927–2011), American jazz singer
- Makai Polk (born 2001), American football player
- Marlyce Polk Reed (born 1955), American composer
- Oscar Polk (1899–1949), American actor
- Ron Polk (born 1944), American college baseball coach
- Rufus K. Polk (1866–1902), American politician
- Sarah Childress Polk (1803–1891), wife of James K. Polk
- Shawntinice Polk (1983–2005), American basketball player
- Susan Polk (born 1957), American murderer
- Tori Polk (born 1983), American long jumper
- Trusten Polk (1811–1876), American governor, United States senator and Confederate Army officer
- VanLeer Polk (1858–1907), American politician
- William Polk (disambiguation)
- Willis Polk (1867–1924), American architect

== Given name ==
- Polk Laffoon (1844–1906), American lawyer and U.S. Representative from Kentucky
- Polk Miller (c. 1840–1913), American pharmacist, musician, and Confederate soldier
- Polk Robison (1912–2008), American collegiate basketball and football coach and athletics administrator
- Polk, a Paiute (Native American) chief who fought in the Bluff War

== See also ==
- Paulk, a surname
- Palk (disambiguation)
