= Elizabeth Childress Brown =

First Lady of Tennessee

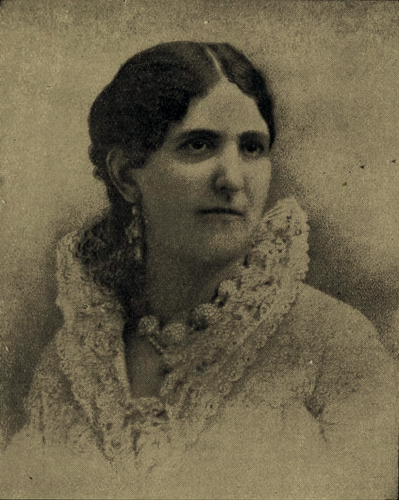

President General of the United Daughters of the Confederacy
- In office 1894–1895
- Preceded by: Caroline Meriwether Goodlett
- Succeeded by: Katie Cabell Currie Muse

First Lady of Tennessee
- In office October 10, 1871 – January 18, 1875
- Governor: John C. Brown
- Preceded by: Harriet T. Senter
- Succeeded by: Susannah Dunlap Porter

Personal details
- Born: February 8, 1842 Murfreesboro, Tennessee, U.S.
- Died: March 1, 1919 (aged 77) Nashville, Tennessee, U.S.
- Resting place: Maplewood Cemetery
- Spouse: John C. Brown (m. 1864)
- Children: 4
- Parents: John W. Childress (father); Sarah Williams (mother)
- Relatives: Sarah Childress Polk (aunt); James K. Polk (uncle)
- Education: Nashville Female Academy

Elizabeth Childress Brown (February 8, 1842 – March 1, 1919) was an American civic leader and socialite. As the wife of Governor John C. Brown, she served as the First Lady of Tennessee from 1871 to 1875. She also served as President General of the United Daughters of the Confederacy from 1894 to 1895. Brown was a niece of President James K. Polk and First Lady Sarah Childress Polk.

== Early life and family ==
Brown was born in Murfreesboro, Tennessee, the daughter of Major John W. Childress and Sarah Williams Childress. Her paternal aunt was First Lady Sarah Childress Polk, wife of President James K. Polk. Her father later resided at the Childress-Ray House, where her aunt was often a guest.

She was educated at the Nashville Female Academy. She graduated with the first honors of her class.

== Public life and civic engagements ==
As a young woman, she was a renowned southern belle and spent a lot of time at Polk Place, the Nashville home of her aunt and uncle, where she assisted her aunt in hosting government officials and elected members of the Tennessee General Assembly.

Brown served as First Lady of Tennessee during her husband's term as Governor of Tennessee from 1894 to 1895. She was known to entertain with elaborate parties during her time as first lady.

Following the organizing of the United Daughters of the Confederacy in 1894 by Caroline Meriwether Goodlett and Anna Davenport Raines, Brown was elected as president general at the organization's second national meeting in 1895. She succeeded Goodlett, who served as president general under the organization's former name, "National Association of the Daughters of the Confederacy", and was the first president general of the organization under its new name, "United Daughters of the Confederacy". She was also a member of the Daughters of the American Revolution and served as president of the Vanderbilt Aid Society.

In 1902, she attended the Charleston Exposition in Charleston, South Carolina, where she visited Fort Sumter. She received much attention from the public during her visit to South Carolina.

== Personal life ==
During the Civil War, Brown met and entertained many Confederate officers, some of whom were her suitors. She met Major General John C. Brown, an officer in the Army of Tennessee, and became engaged. They were married by Bishop Charles Todd Quintard on February 23, 1864. She and her husband had four children: Marie, Daisy, Elizabeth, and John C. Brown, Jr. Their daughter, Marie, married Benton McMillin.

Brown died on March 1, 1919, at her home on 8th Avenue in Nashville. She was buried next to her husband in Maplewood Cemetery.
