= Elias Polk =

African American enslaved man (1806–1886)

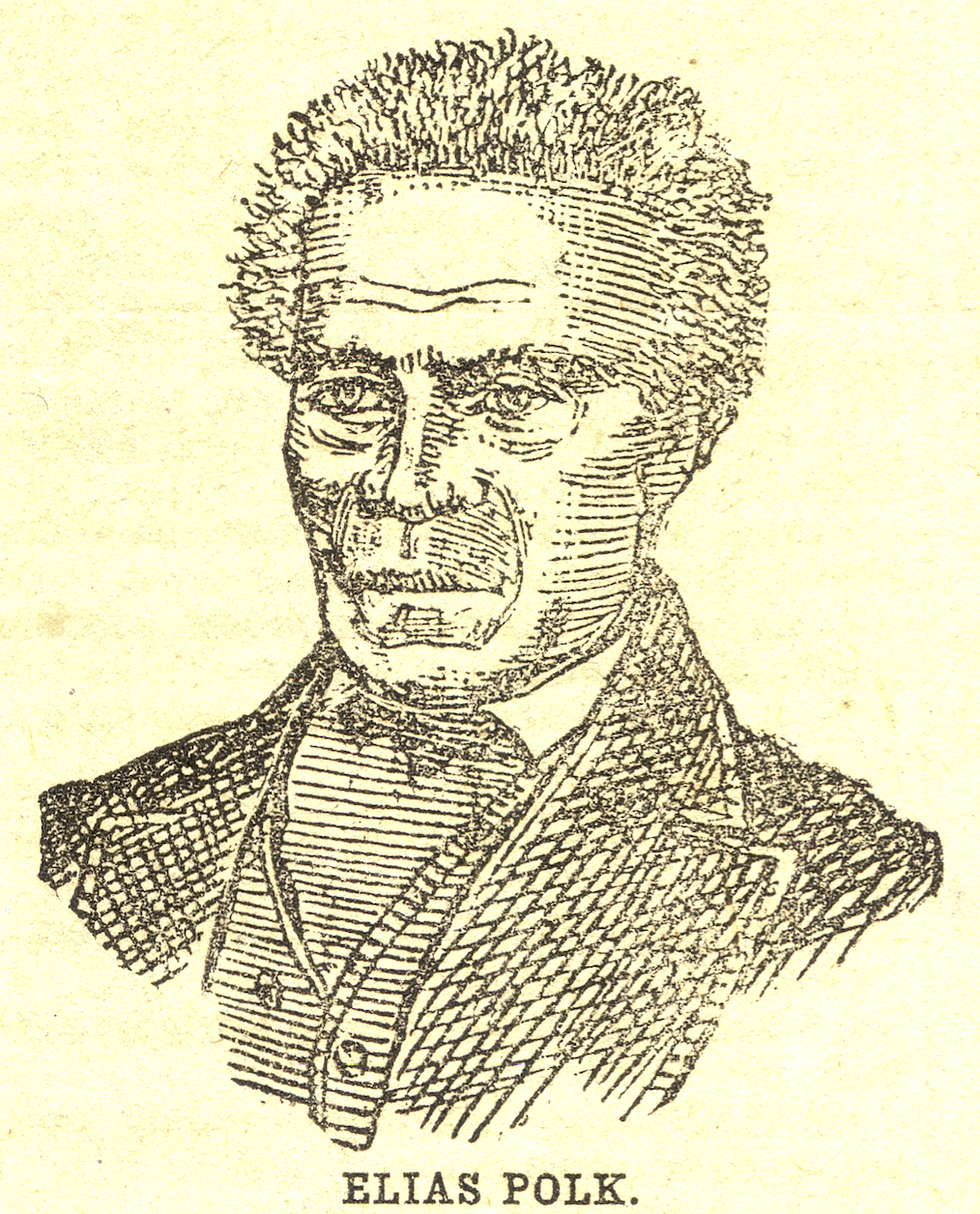
- Illustration from the Daily American newspaper, published in Nashville on December 31, 1886
- Born: c. 1806; Mecklenburg County, North Carolina, U.S.
- Died: December 30, 1886 (aged 79–80); Washington, D.C., U.S.
- Resting place: Nashville City Cemetery
- Occupation: Political activist
- Spouse: 3, including Mary Polk

Elias Polk (c. 1806 – December 30, 1886) was an African American enslaved by President James K. Polk and his family from birth until his emancipation in 1865.

Following the American Civil War, he became a conservative Democratic political activist at a time when most freedmen joined the Republican Party. As an enslaved person, Polk lived and worked at the Polk farm in Maury County, Tennessee, in the Columbia home of James and Sarah Polk, in the White House, and at the Polks' Nashville residence, Polk Place.

After the president's death, Elias Polk continued to live at Polk Place and serve the widowed First Lady Sarah Childress Polk. Once Elias gained freedom, he embarked on a public speaking career in which he took up the cause of the Democratic Party and spoke on behalf of former Confederates and slaveholders.

== Early life ==
Elias Polk was born into slavery in 1806 in Mecklenburg County, North Carolina. He and his mother were enslaved by Samuel Polk, who was a surveyor. Within a year of his birth, the Polk family, along with those they enslaved, relocated west to the Duck River Valley of Middle Tennessee. On this new farm in what would become Maury County, Elias was raised and worked as what records of the time described as a "mill boy." Elias took grain and other farm products to local mills to be processed into flour or meal.

== Career ==
In 1824, Samuel sent 18-year-old Elias to his son James K. Polk as a gift upon the latter's wedding to Sarah Childress. During his time with James and Sarah, Elias Polk worked as a "body servant", or valet, and "coachman" for James in Columbia, Tennessee.

After James Polk was elected President in 1845, he arranged for Elias Polk and Henry Carter, Jr. (whom James Polk also enslaved) to work at the White House to support the household. However, Elias's time in Washington, D.C. was cut short as he was sent to work for attorney James H. Thomas from 1846 to 1847. During the Polk Administration, Elias remained in Maury County laboring for Thomas until 1847, when Thomas was elected to serve in the U.S. House of Representatives. At this time, Elias's rental contract was transferred to a "Mr. Matthews" at the Nelson's House Hotel in Columbia, Tennessee. Elias would remain in this position until 1849, when the Polks returned to Tennessee following the end of James's presidency. By April 1849, Elias was brought to Nashville to labor for James and Sarah Polk as an enslaved domestic servant at their mansion, Polk Place. He was taken back to Tennessee with James Polk's family.

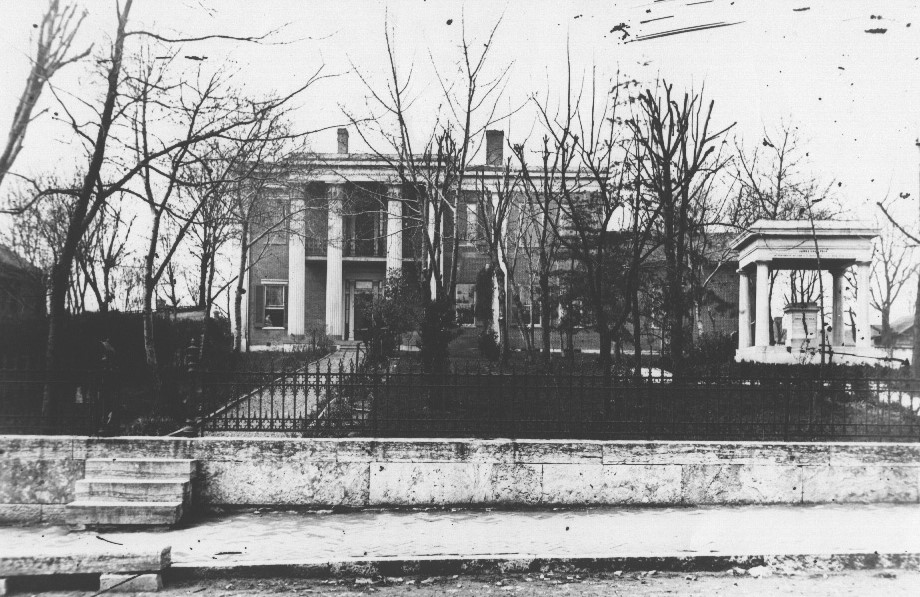
Polk Place in downtown Nashville

President Polk died on June 15, 1849, only three months after leaving office. From this time until the abolition of slavery in 1865, Elias Polk remained enslaved by the widowed, former first lady Sarah Childress Polk.

Following the passage of the 13th Amendment and the end of slavery in the U.S., Elias began a public speaking career. He became active in the Democratic Party, throwing "in his political lot with displaced slave owners". His political alliance was unusual at a time when most freedmen joined the Republican Party. In 1867, Polk was elected as the president of the "Independent Colored Conservative National Club." At a meeting whose speakers included Arthur St. Clair Colyar and Henry S. Foote in June 1867, Polk called for harmony between blacks and whites. He suggested that a new federal tax on cotton production hurt African Americans.

From 1871 to 1876, Polk worked as a porter, or custodian, at the Tennessee Senate in Nashville. He returned to Washington, D.C., to work as a "laborer" at the United States Capitol from 1876 to 1882. After returning to Nashville, Polk traveled back to Washington, D.C., a few years later, where he met President Grover Cleveland three days before his death.

== Personal life, death and legacy ==
Polk was officially married twice, with a possible unrecognized earlier slave marriage. His first marriage to Harriet James was short, as the bride fell ill and died shortly after the wedding. His second wife, Mary Mansfield, worked in the coat room at the U.S. Capitol when she met Elias Polk. The two lived in the same Washington boarding house and were married in Davidson County, Tennessee, in the 1880s. Mary was 41 years younger than Elias at the time of the marriage.

After visiting Washington, D.C., in 1886, Elias Polk met with President Grover Cleveland at the White House. He was informed by Captain Samuel Donelson, an employee of the U.S. House of Representatives, that Elias was to be reappointed to his old position as a "laborer" at the Capitol. However, that same day, Elias Polk died on December 30, 1886, in a hotel room in Washington, D.C. At the time of his death, Elias was in a considerable amount of debt, and his wife, Mary, was forced to mortgage her Nashville home and carriage to pay off the debts. This left her without the funds to return Elias's body to Nashville for burial. Finally, in February 1887, three months after his death, Elias's body was returned to Nashville, where a funeral was held at Clark's Chapel, later known as Clark Memorial United Methodist Church. He was buried in the Nashville City Cemetery.

Historian Zacharie Kinslow states, "During his life, Elias Polk went from being enslaved in the White House to one of the most controversial African-American political activists of his day." For journalist Jesse J. Holland, the author of The Invisibles: The Untold Story of African-American Slaves in the White House, "In today's parlance, we'd call (Polk) an 'Uncle Tom' because he's taking the gentry's side. But that's how he felt."
