= Palk =

Palk may refer to:

- Palk (surname)
- Palk Baronets
- Palk Strait, a strait between India and Sri Lanka
- Palk Bay, a bay between India and Sri Lanka

== See also ==
- Paulk, a surname
- Polk (disambiguation)
- Palk v Mortgage Services Funding plc, a judicial decision of Court of Appeal of England and Wales
