= Polk =

Polk may refer to:

== People ==
- Polk (name), a list of people with the surname or given name

== Places in the United States ==
- Polk, Missouri, an unincorporated community
- Polk, Nebraska, a village
- Polk, Ohio, a village
- Polk, Pennsylvania, a borough
- Polk, West Virginia, an unincorporated community
- Polk, Wisconsin, a town
- Polk City, Florida, a city
- Polk City, Iowa, a city
- Polk County (disambiguation)
- Polk Township (disambiguation)
- Camp Polk (Oregon), a former military installation
- Fort Johnson, formerly Fort Polk, a United States Army base in Leesville, Louisiana

== Other uses ==
- Polk Street, San Francisco
- Polk station, a train station in Chicago, Illinois
- POLK, a human gene
- Polk Audio, American audio equipment manufacturer
- Polk Home, Columbia, Tennessee, sole surviving residence of U.S. President James K. Polk
- Polk Hotel, an historic hotel in Haines City, Florida
- Polk State College, Winter Haven, Florida

== See also ==
- Poke (disambiguation)
- Pokeweed, "Polk salad"
- Sigmar Polke (1941–2010), German artist
