= 1870 Tennessee gubernatorial election =

- November 8, 1870
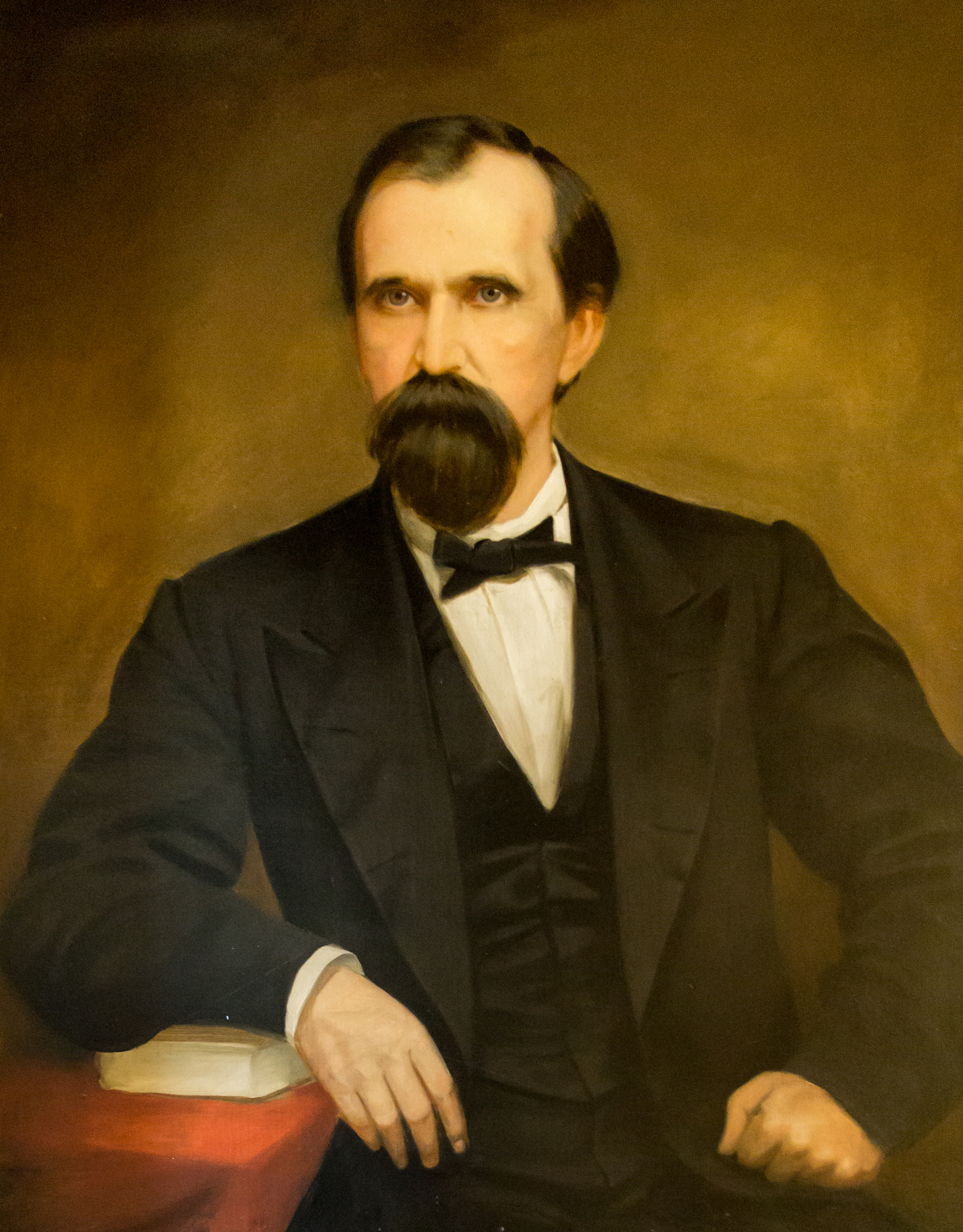

Nominee	John C. Brown	William H. Wisener
Party	Democratic	Republican
Popular vote	78,979	41,500
Percentage	65.55%	34.45%
- County results Brown: 50–60% 60–70% 70–80% 80–90% >90% Wisener: 50–60% 60–70% 70–80% 80–90% >90% No data
Governor before election
DeWitt Clinton Senter
Republican
Elected Governor
John C. Brown
Democratic

The 1870 Tennessee gubernatorial election was held on November 8, 1870, to elect the governor of Tennessee. The Democratic nominee, former Confederate general John C. Brown overwhelmingly defeated Republican nominee William H. Wisener by a margin of 31.10%.

== Background ==
Following the Civil War, Tennessee was led Governor Parson Brownlow, a Radical Republican who oversaw the passage of legislation giving rights to freed slaves while removing suffrage from ex-Confederates. Brownlow's policies were opposed by Conservatives in the state who favored reconciliation with ex-Confederates.

Following a strong performance in the 1866 elections, The Conservatives would field former Unionist Emerson Etheridge to oppose Brownlow in the 1867 Tennessee gubernatorial election; however, Brownlow would win re-election by a margin of 53%, significantly aided by the enfranchisement of 40,000 African-Americans earlier in the year.

Brownlow would leave office in 1869 after winning election to the United States Senate and would be succeeded by Dewitt Clinton Senter, whose conservative policies would cause division in Tennessee's Republican party and embolden Tennessee's conservatives, who won control of the General Assembly in August 1869 and repealed many of the laws enacted under Brownlow. The conservative-controlled General Assembly would also successfully call for a constitutional convention which restored suffrage to ex-Confederates.

== General election ==
=== Candidates ===
- John C. Brown, Democratic
- William H. Wisener, Republican

=== Results ===
Tennessee gubernatorial election, 1870
Party	Candidate	Votes	%
Democratic	John C. Brown	78,979	65.55
Republican	William H. Wisener	41,500	34.45
Total votes		120,479	100.00
Democratic hold			
