= Samuel Read Anderson =

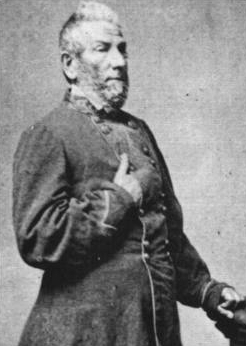
- Gen. Samuel R. Anderson
- Born: February 17, 1804; Bedford County, Virginia
- Died: January 2, 1883 (aged 78); Nashville, Tennessee
- Burial place: Nashville City Cemetery, Nashville, Tennessee
- Military career
- Allegiance: United States of America; Confederate States of America
- Branch: United States Army; Confederate States Army
- Service years: 1846–1847 (USA); 1861–1862, 1864–1865 (CSA)
- Rank: Lieutenant Colonel (USV); Brigadier General (CSA)
- Unit: 1st Tennessee Volunteer Infantry
- Commands: Anderson's Brigade, Military District of Northern Virginia
- Conflicts: Mexican–American War; American Civil War: Battle of Cheat Mountain
- Other work: Postmaster of Nashville, Tennessee

Samuel Read Anderson (February 17, 1804 – January 2, 1883) was an American businessman and military officer in the Mexican-American War. He was the Postmaster of Nashville, Tennessee, from 1853 until 1861 and then was a Confederate Brigadier General during the American Civil War. He commanded a mixed brigade of infantry and cavalry in the Eastern Theater in Virginia until the spring of 1862 when he was forced to resign because of ill health. Anderson later supervised the Confederate military draft in Tennessee until the end of the war.

== Early life and career ==
Samuel R. Anderson was born in Bedford County, Virginia to Robert Anderson, formerly an officer in the American Revolution. His family moved westward, first to the Kentucky frontier and then to Tennessee where he was educated and raised. By the mid-1840s he had married and become a successful businessman and one of the leading citizens of Davidson County, Tennessee.

During the Mexican War, he helped recruit volunteers from the state to serve in the Federal army. He received a commission as the Lieutenant Colonel of the 1st Tennessee Volunteer Infantry Regiment and served with that unit in Mexico.

After the war, he returned to Tennessee and worked for the Bank of Tennessee. In 1853 received a political patronage position as the postmaster of Nashville. He served in that role until the outbreak of the Civil War, when he resigned in May 1861 to join the state's pro-Confederate forces.

== Civil War service ==
On May 9, 1861, Anderson, because of his previous military experience and political connections, received a commission from Tennessee's governor Isham G. Harris as a major general in the state's provisional forces. Within a few weeks, those units were formally transferred to the Provisional Army of the Confederate States (PACS) and Anderson became a Confederate brigadier general on July 9.

He commanded a brigade of the 1st, 7th, and 14th Tennessee infantry and one company of Tennessee cavalry. His troops were transported to western Virginia where he played a role in the Cheat Mountain campaign while serving under Robert E. Lee. He then was assigned to the command of William W. Loring and spent the winter of 1861-62 serving in the mountains of western Virginia before being transferred with his brigade to help in the defenses of Yorktown, Virginia. However, his health has been impaired by the harsh service and he resigned on May 10, 1862, and returned home.

On November 7, 1864, Anderson returned to the rank of brigadier general when at the age of sixty he accepted an appointment from the Confederate President Jefferson Davis, and supervised the Confederate Bureau of Conscription for Tennessee. However, with much of Tennessee in Federal hands, Anderson was forced to establish his headquarters in Selma, Alabama, for the rest of the war.

== Later life and career ==
After the Civil War ended in 1865, Anderson was paroled and he returned to Tennessee. He became a prominent businessman in Nashville and was active in veterans affairs.

Samuel R. Anderson died in Nashville on January 2, 1883, and is buried in the Nashville City Cemetery.

== See also ==
- List of American Civil War generals (Confederate)
