= 5th Tennessee Cavalry Regiment (Union) =

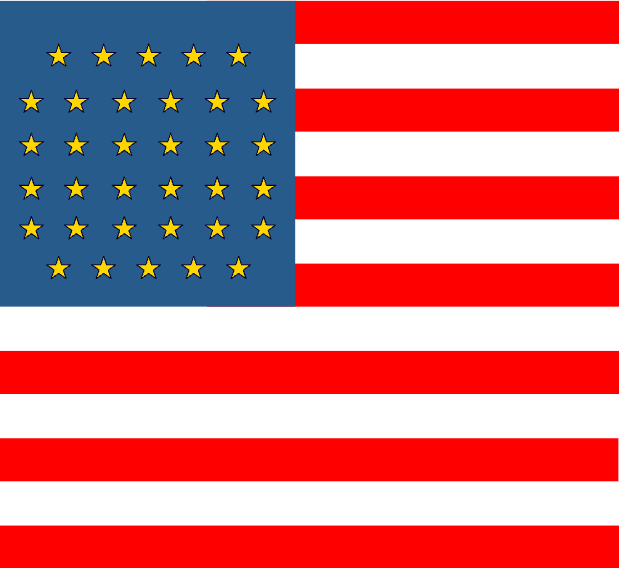
- 34 star National Flag used by 5th Tennessee
- Active: July 15, 1862, to August 14, 1865
- Country: United States
- Allegiance: Union
- Branch: Cavalry
- Engagements: Battle of Stones River; Tullahoma Campaign; Battle of Wauhatchie (Company G); Battle of Missionary Ridge

The 5th Tennessee Cavalry Regiment was a cavalry regiment that served in the Union Army during the American Civil War. This regiment was originally recruited as the 1st Middle Tennessee Cavalry.

== Service ==
The 5th Tennessee Cavalry was organized at Murfreesboro, Nashville, and Carthage, Tennessee and mustered in for a three-year enlistment on July 15, 1862, under the command of Colonel William Brickly Stokes.

The regiment was attached to Post of Nashville, Tennessee, Army of the Ohio, to November 1862. Reserve Cavalry, Cavalry Division, Army of the Cumberland, to January 1863. Post of Nashville, Tennessee, Department of the Cumberland, to June 1863. Post of Nashville, Tennessee, Reserve Corps, Department of the Cumberland, June 1863. 1st Brigade, 2nd Cavalry Division, Army of the Cumberland, to August 1863. 3rd Brigade, 2nd Division, Cavalry Corps, Department of the Cumberland, to November 1863. 1st Brigade, 2nd Cavalry Division, Army of the Cumberland, to April 1864. 2nd Brigade, 4th Division, Cavalry Corps, Department of the Cumberland, to October 1864. 2nd Brigade, 4th Division, Cavalry Corps, Military Division Mississippi, to November 1864. 3rd Brigade, 6th Division, Cavalry Corps, Military Division Mississippi, to February 1865. 3rd Brigade, 6th Division, Cavalry Corps, Military Division Mississippi, to February 1865. District Middle Tennessee, to August 1865.

The 5th Tennessee Cavalry mustered out of service on August 14, 1865.

== Detailed service ==
Duty at Nashville, Tenn., until December 26, 1862. Affair at Kinderhook August 11, 1862. Skirmish near Nashville September 2. Siege of Nashville September 7–November 7. Goodlettsville September 30. Gallatin October 1. Near Humboldt October 9. Near Nashville November 5. Near Lavergne November 7. Reconnaissance toward Lavergne November 19. Reconnaissance to Franklin December 11–12. Franklin December 12. Advance on Murfreesboro December 26–30. Nolensville Pike December 27. Wilkinson's Cross Roads December 29. Battle of Stones River December 30–31, 1862 and January 1–3, 1863. Overall's Creek December 31, 1862. Lytle's Creek January 5. Reconnaissance to Auburn, Liberty and Cainesville January 20–22. Near Cainesville February 15. Manchester Pike February 22. Bradysville March 1. Expedition to Woodbury March 3–8. Near Auburn March 8. Vaught's Hill near Milton March 20 (Company E). Expedition to Auburn, Liberty, Snow Hill, etc., April 2–6. Snow Hill or Smith's Ford and Liberty April 3. Liberty April 7. Expedition to McMinnville April 20–30. Hartsville April 22. Bradyville Pike May 17. (Two companies on Streight's Raid toward Rome, Ga., April 26–May 3. Day's Gap or Sand Mountain, Crooked Creek and Hog Mountain April 30. Blountsville and East Branch, Big Warrior River, May 1. Blake's Creek near Gadsden May 2. Blount's Farm and near Centre May 2. Near Cedar Bluff May 3.) Bradyville Pike May 17. Expedition to Middleton May 21–22. Scout on Middleton or Eagleville Pike June 10. Expedition to Lebanon June 15–17. Skirmish at Lebanon June 16. Dixon Springs June 20. Tullahoma Campaign June 23-July 7. Shelbyville June 25. Fosterville, Guy's Gap and Shelbyville June 27. Duty at Carthage, McMinnville, Alexandria, Tracy City and Shelbyville, operating against guerrillas on line of the Nashville & Chattanooga Railroad until February 1864. Pulaski July 15, 1863. Expedition to Huntsville, Ala., July 18–22. Scout in Sequatchie Valley September 21–22. Missionary Ridge and Shallow Ford Gap September 22. Operations against Wheller and Roddy October 1–17. Reopening Tennessee River October 26–29 (Company G). Battle of Wauhatchie, Tenn., October 28–29 (Company G). Centreville October 29 (Company G). Eagleville December 7. McMinnville December 21. Lavergne December 29. Scout to White and Putnam Counties February 1–7, 1864. Operations against guerrillas about Sparta February to April, Johnson's Mills February 22 (detachment). Sparta and Calf Killer River February 22. White County March 10. Operations about Sparta March 11–28. Calf Killer River March 11. Winchester March 17. Beersheeba Springs March 19. Duty at Nashville, Tenn., and on line of the Nashville & Chattanooga Railroad at McMinnville, Carthage, Tullahoma and other points until November 1864. Scout in Lincoln County July 12–15. McMinnville August. Murfreesboro September 4. Operations about Murfreesboro November 1864 to January 1865. Siege of Murfreesboro December 4–12, 1864. Overall's Creek December 4 (detachment). Demonstrations on Murfreesboro December 5–7. Wilkinson's Cross Road near Murfreesboro and the Cedars December 7. Ordered to Fayetteville January 1865, and duty patrolling line of the Nashville & Chattanooga Railroad and duty in District of East Tennessee until August 1865. Skirmish near McMinnville February 5, 1865.

== Casualties ==
The regiment lost a total of 245 men during service; 1 officer and 68 enlisted men killed or mortally wounded, 1 officer and 175 enlisted men died of disease or accident.

== Commanders ==
- Colonel William Brickly Stokes

== See also ==
- List of Tennessee Civil War units
- Tennessee in the Civil War
