= Paulk =

Paulk is the surname of:

- Anne Paulk, executive director of Restored Hope Network, an interdenominational Christian ex-gay ministry, former wife of John Paulk
- Charles Paulk (1809–1885), American politician
- Charlie Paulk (1946–2014), American National Basketball Association player
- Earl Paulk (1927–2009), American televangelist
- James Paulk (1920–2005), American politician
- Jeff Paulk (born 1976), American former National Football League player
- John Paulk (born 1963), American anti-gay activist who later reversed his stance
- a sept of the Scottish Clan Maxwell

== See also ==
- Rehberg v. Paulk, a United States Supreme Court case
- Palk (disambiguation)
- Polk (name), a surname and given name
