= President James K. Polk Home & Museum =

Historic house in Tennessee, United States

- James K. Polk Home
- U.S. National Register of Historic Places
- U.S. National Historic Landmark
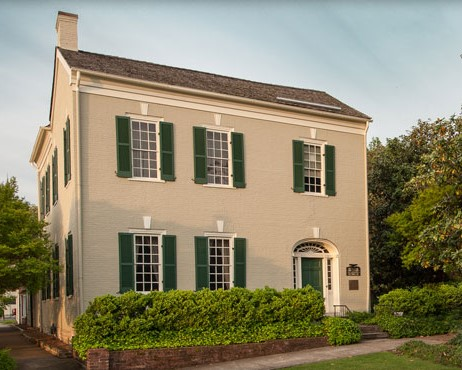

- Location within Tennessee Location within the United States
- Interactive map showing the location of President Hames K. Polk House & Museum
- Location: W. 7th and S. High Sts., Columbia, Tennessee
- Coordinates: 35°36′53.71″N 87°2′14.36″W
- Area: 1.9 acres (0.77 ha)
- Built: 1816
- Architect: Presumed Samuel Polk
- Architectural style: Federal
- NRHP reference No.: 66000728

Significant dates
- Added to NRHP: October 15, 1966
- Designated NHL: July 4, 1961

The President James K. Polk Home & Museum is the presidential museum for the 11th president of the United States, James K. Polk (1795–1849), and is located at 301 West 7th Street in Columbia, Tennessee. Built in 1816, it is the only surviving private residence of United States President James K. Polk. It was designated a National Historic Landmark in 1961, and is listed on the National Register of Historic Places. As President Polk's primary historic site it is open daily (except select holidays) for guided tours.

== Description and history ==
The James K. Polk Home is located just west of the commercial central downtown area of Columbia, at the southwest corner of West 7th and South High streets. It is an L-shaped brick building, two stories in height, with a gabled roof. The front facade, facing West 7th Street, is three bays wide, with the main entrance in the rightmost bay, recessed in a segmented-arch opening. The door is flanked by sidelight windows and topped by a semi-oval transom window with tracery, and the interior walls of the recess are paneled. The other bays house windows, which are topped by lintels of brick and a stone keystone. The interior retains finishes period to its construction, but has otherwise been adapted for museum displays. The property includes a reproduction of the kitchen outbuilding that would have been present during Polk's residency; none of the outbuildings from his time survive.

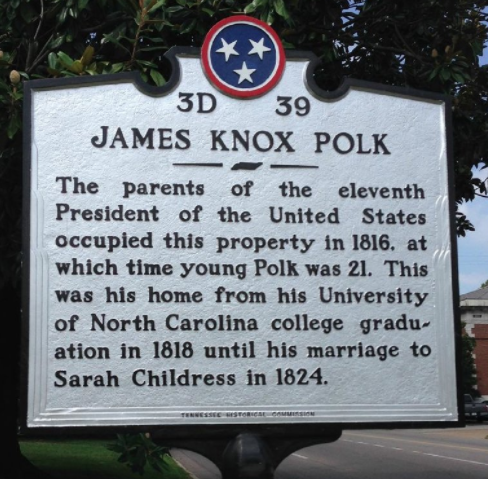
Tennessee Historical Commission Marker outside of home.

The house was built in 1816 by Samuel Polk, and was the home of his son, U.S. President James K. Polk, for six years as a young adult. It is the only private residence associated with President Polk to survive. James lived in the house until 1824 on and off again, when he left to read law in Nashville under Felix Grundy, and for a time after his return to Columbia, where he opened his law practice. He would move into a home down the street with his wife Sarah Childress around the same time in 1824 where they spent the longest duration of their lives together. (That home was destroyed by fire in the late 19th century, and is currently a funeral home parking lot.) The president would own the Home after his father's death in 1827 while his mother lived in the home until her death in 1852. One of the president's younger brothers William Hawkins Polk was the last Polk to directly live in the home, and his son would be the last Polk to own it until 1871. It passed through several owners before its acquisition by the president's great-great niece along with the state of Tennessee in 1929.

The museum is operated by the James K. Polk Memorial Association, but is entrusted to the organization by the state of Tennessee.

Some exterior items were moved to the site after Polk Place, the president's later home, was demolished including the fountain, garden urns, and other pieces.

== History of the museum ==
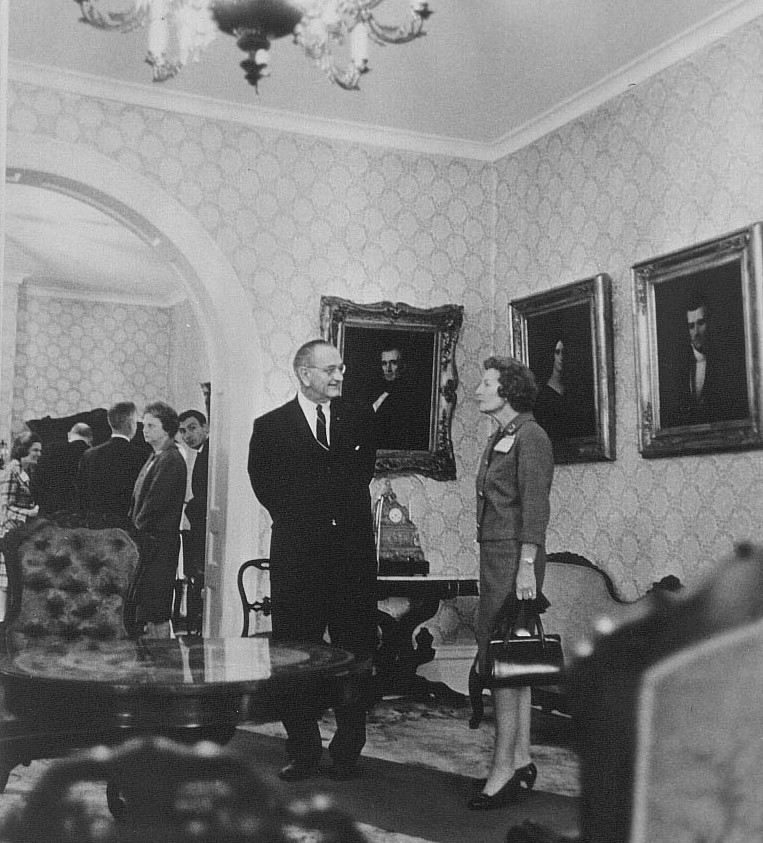
Lyndon B. Johnson, meeting with a past president of the Polk Association.

Shortly after the president's death his wife Sarah Polk fostered a great niece, Sallie Fall. Sallie stayed in Nashville with Sarah for a large portion of her life. Sarah would leave the contents of Polk Place along with personal belongings of the president to Sallie after her death.

Sallie opened her own home in Nashville to the public throughout the early 1900s for people to come and see the belongings of the president that she had inherited. Along with her daughter, Mrs. Saidee Grant, they founded the James K. Polk Association in 1924. In 1929 Mrs. Grant, along with the state of Tennessee, purchased the home, and moved the contents of Polk Place that she had inherited from her mother to the site.

== Relocation of tomb ==
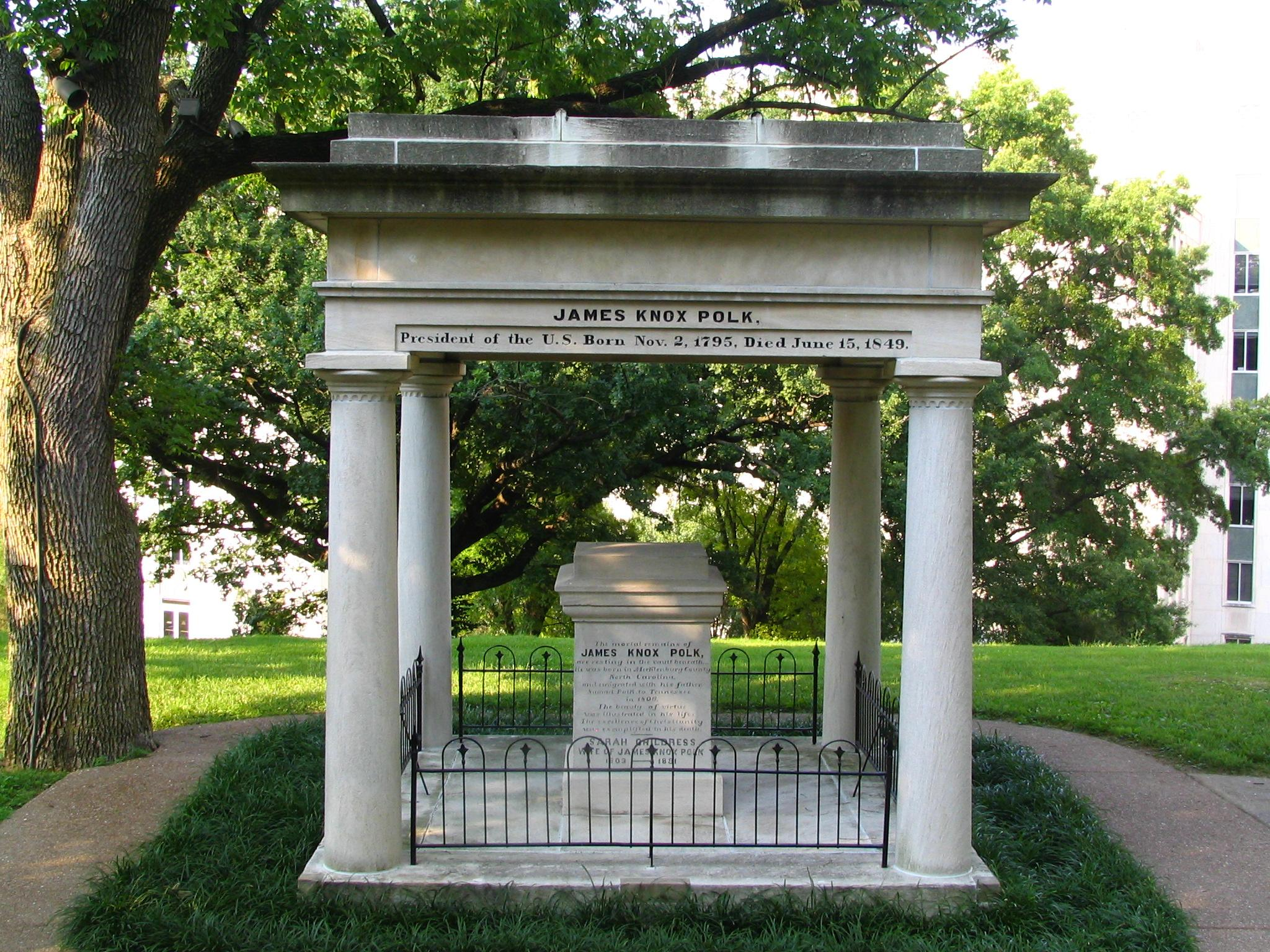
The president's Tomb outside of state Capitol.

On March 27, 2017, the Tennessee Senate voted 20–6 to relocate the remains of President Polk and his wife Sarah Childress Polk from the Tennessee State Capitol in Nashville to the Polk home. On March 3, 2018, the bill passed the State Government Committee and went before the floor of the state legislature, when the State Senate approved an amendment that was added on to the resolution. Though it subsequently failed the state legislature on March 19, 2018, it went before the house Calendar & Rules Committee where they allowed to let it go before the floor again on April 9, 2018, where it passed by 51–47. (Shortly after Governor Bill Haslam allowed the bill to go into effect without his signature. ) The next steps included the Tennessee Historical Commission, the Capitol Grounds Commission and after it will go before a Chancery Judge before it is finalized.

== See also ==
- Polk Place, Nashville home of President Polk and Mrs. Polk
- List of National Historic Landmarks in Tennessee
- National Register of Historic Places listings in Maury County, Tennessee
- List of residences of presidents of the United States
- Presidential memorials in the United States
- List of memorials to James K. Polk
