= Dewitt Clinton Senter =

American politician (1830–1898)

DeWitt Clinton Senter
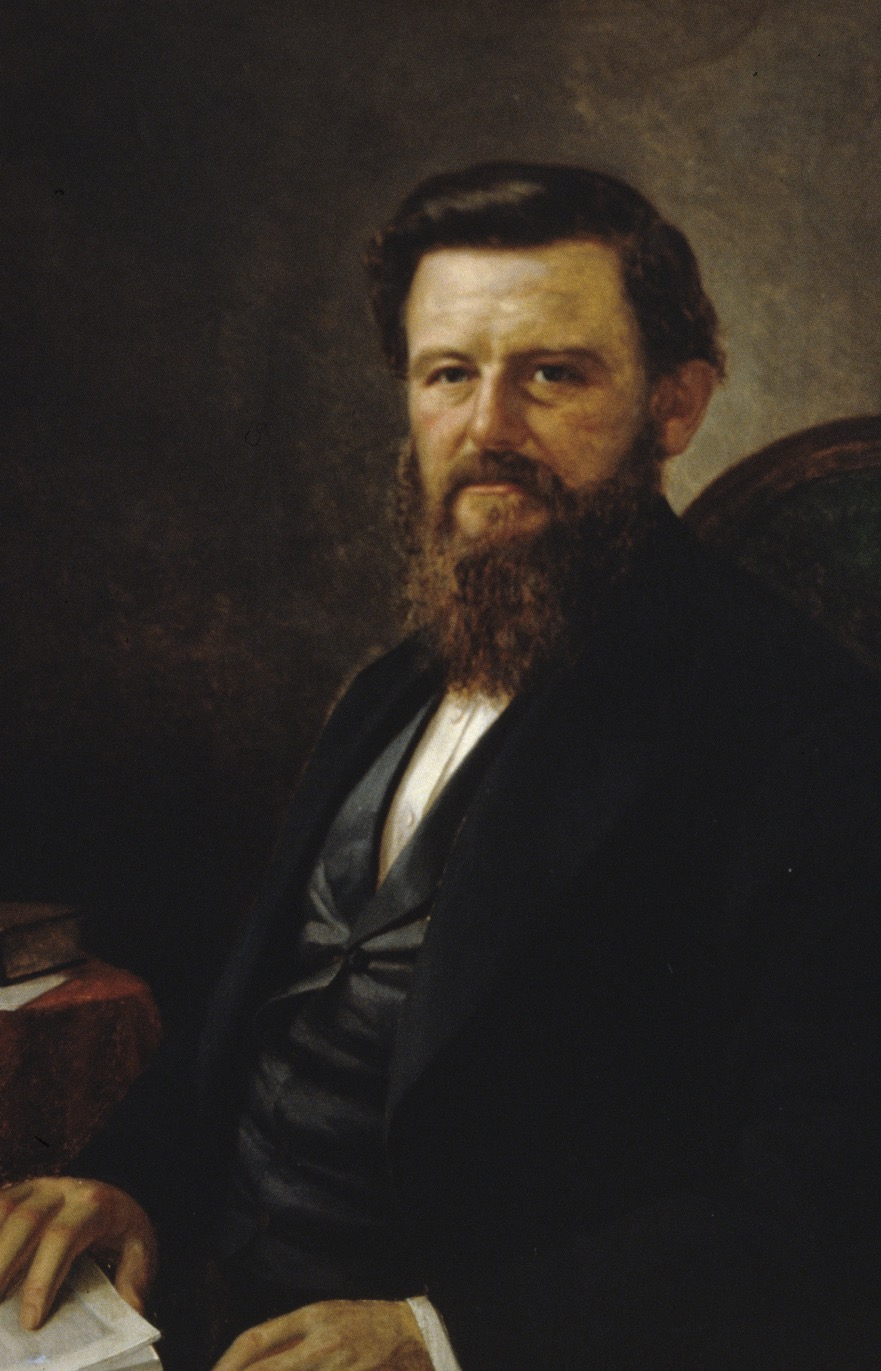

18th Governor of Tennessee
- In office February 25, 1869 – October 10, 1871
- Preceded by: William G. Brownlow
- Succeeded by: John C. Brown

Speaker of the Tennessee Senate
- In office 1867–1869
- Preceded by: Joshua B. Frierson
- Succeeded by: Philip P.C. Nelson

Member of the Tennessee House of Representatives
- In office 1855–1861

Member of the Tennessee Senate
- In office 1865–1869

Personal details
- Born: March 26, 1830 McMinn County, Tennessee
- Died: June 14, 1898 (aged 68) Morristown, Tennessee
- Resting place: Emma Jarnagin Cemetery, Morristown, Tennessee
- Party: Whig, Republican
- Spouse: Harriet T. Senter (1859)
- Profession: Farmer

Dewitt Clinton Senter (March 26, 1830 – June 14, 1898) was an American politician who served as the 18th governor of Tennessee from 1869 to 1871. He had previously served in the Tennessee House of Representatives (1855–1861), where he opposed secession on the eve of the Civil War. He was elected to the Tennessee Senate following the war, and was chosen as Speaker of the Senate in 1867. As speaker, he became governor upon the resignation of William G. Brownlow in 1869.

Senter is perhaps best remembered for undoing many of Brownlow's radical initiatives, most notably the restoring of the right to vote to former Confederates. The current Tennessee State Constitution was written and enacted during Senter's tenure.

== Early life and career ==
Senter was born in McMinn County, Tennessee, the son of William Tandy Senter and Nancy White. His father was a popular Methodist minister and renowned orator who served in the United States House of Representatives in the mid-1840s, and was a delegate to Tennessee's 1834 constitutional convention. Dewitt grew up in what is now Hamblen County, Tennessee (then part of Grainger County), where he attended public schools. He studied at Strawberry Plains College in nearby Strawberry Plains from 1851 to 1852, and read law for about a year under Judge T.W. Turley. He had predominantly English ancestry.

Senter represented Grainger County in the state House of Representatives from 1855 to 1861. A Whig, he remained staunchly opposed to secession on the eve of the Civil War. In May 1861, he voted against the state's Ordinance of Secession, and canvassed in East Tennessee in an attempt to rally the region's Unionists. He was a member of the Grainger County delegation at the East Tennessee Convention, which sought to form a separate, Union-aligned state in East Tennessee. In 1862, Senter was arrested and jailed for several months by Confederate authorities. After his release, he fled to Louisville, Kentucky. He was an elector for the Republican Party ticket in the 1864 presidential election.

In January 1865, Senter was elected to the Tennessee Senate, representing Grainger, Claiborne, Anderson, and Campbell counties, and served as the Senate's Chairman of the Committee on Incorporations. That same year, he became president of the Cincinnati, Cumberland Gap and Charleston Railroad, a position in which he served until 1866. In 1867, the state senate elected him Speaker of the Senate.

== Governor ==
Senter initially supported the Radical Republican initiatives of Governor William G. Brownlow, which included the disfranchisement of ex-Confederates. In October 1867, he helped elect Brownlow to the United States Senate seat held by David T. Patterson, whose term was set to expire in March 1869. Brownlow resigned as governor on February 25, 1869, and departed for Washington, D.C., to take his seat in the Senate. Under the Tennessee Constitution, the Speaker of the Senate is the first in the gubernatorial line of succession, and thus Senter became governor following Brownlow's resignation.

Brownlow's radical policies of disfranchisement had left the state divided and had led to the rise of the Ku Klux Klan. In his inaugural address, Senter vowed to aggressively pursue the Klan and quell Klan violence. In May 1869, however, he disbanded the state guard, which had been fighting the Klan, but had become unpopular. He also announced he supported restoring the voting rights of former Confederates.

Since Brownlow was near the end of his term as governor when he resigned, Senter was thrust into a reelection campaign within a few weeks of taking office. His relatively lenient policies toward former Confederates led to a rift in the state's Radical Republican ranks, as many Radicals wanted to continue Brownlow's policies and feared retribution if ex-Confederates and Democrats should once again control the state. At the Radicals' tumultuous convention on May 20, 1869, they were unable to agree on a candidate for governor. In subsequent separate conventions, the Radicals who favored continuing Brownlow's policies nominated William B. Stokes, and those who favored more lenient policies nominated Senter.

Under Brownlow, the legislature had given the governor the power to appoint county election commissioners, who were charged with ensuring former Confederates did not vote. Using this power, Senter replaced nearly three-fourths of Brownlow's commissioners. While the law still technically forbade ex-Confederates from voting, Senter's new commissioners did not enforce this law. Thus, with large numbers of former Confederates now voting, Senter easily defeated Stokes on election day by a vote of 120,333 to 55,036.

To address issues over voting and disfranchisement, a new state constitutional convention convened in 1870. This convention, among other things, modified the state constitution to allow all men of at least 21 years of age (whether white or black) to vote, though it also instituted a poll tax, and ordered separate schools for white and black children. The new constitution was approved by a 98,128 to 33,972 vote.

Along with voting issues, one of Senter's primary concerns was the state's rising debt. In December 1869, Senter called for prison reform, arguing that prisons had become a financial drain on the state. Hoping to encourage immigration into the state and increase property tax revenues, Senter established the Tennessee Immigration and Labor Association in February 1871. He also favored initiatives to help railroads struggling to pay interest on state-issued bonds.

In 1870, Senter used his influence to help establish Hamblen County, which was created from parts of Grainger, Jefferson, and Hawkins counties. Senter's home was located within the new county.

== Later life ==
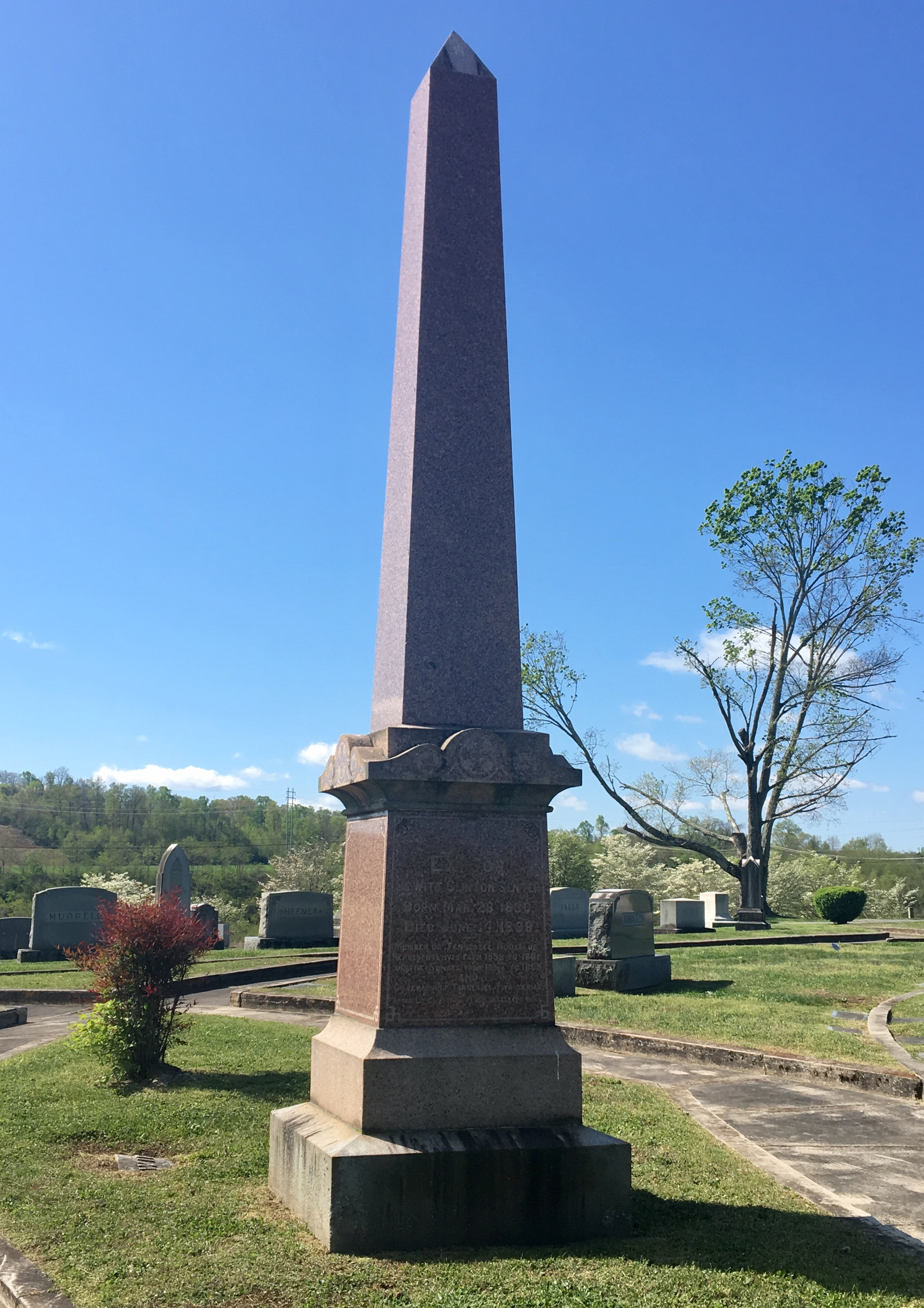
Senter’s grave in Morristown, Tennessee.

Senter's policies, which allowed Democrats to regain control of the state, angered the state's Republicans, and effectively ended his political career. He spent his remaining years managing his large farm near Morristown. He died on June 14, 1898, and is buried in Morristown's Emma Jarnagin Cemetery.

== Family ==
Senter married Harriet Senter (a distant cousin) in 1859. She was the daughter of Grainger County's circuit court clerk, P.M. Senter. They had no children.

Party political offices
Preceded by William G. Brownlow	Republican nominee for Governor of Tennessee; 1869	Succeeded by William H. Wisener
Political offices
Preceded by William G. Brownlow	Governor of Tennessee; 1869–1871	Succeeded by John C. Brown
