= John W. Childress =

American banker and politician

John Whitsett Childress

Attorney General Pro Tempore of Tennessee
- In office 1829–1831

Personal details
- Born: June 1, 1807 Sumner County, Tennessee, U.S.
- Died: October 6, 1884 (aged 77) Murfreesboro, Tennessee, U.S.
- Resting place: Evergreen Cemetery
- Spouse(s): Sarah Josey Williams (m. 1831) Mary E. Phillips (m. 1852)
- Children: 12, including Elizabeth Childress Brown
- Relatives: Sarah Childress Polk (sister)
- Education: University of North Carolina
- Occupation: banker lawyer politician

John Whitsett Childress (June 1, 1807 – October 6, 1884) was an American banker, lawyer, and politician.

== Early life ==
Childress was born in Sumner County, Tennessee, on June 1, 1807, to Joel Childress and Elizabeth Whitsett. In 1819, the family moved to Murfreesboro. His sister, Sarah Childress, married James K. Polk, who became the Governor of Tennessee and then President of the United States.

He graduated from the University of North Carolina in Chapel Hill, North Carolina.

== Career ==
After graduating from college, Childress was admitted to the Tennessee Bar. In 1829, he was elected Tennessee Attorney General Pro Tempore. Along with practicing law, he farmed on his estate in the Shelbyville Pike and served as director of the Nashville and Chattanooga Railroad, as director of the Bank of Tennessee, as president of the First National Bank of Murfreesboro, and as president of the Planter's Bank of Tennessee.

== Personal life ==
In 1831, Childress married Sarah Williams, daughter of Elisha Williams and niece of Judge Joseph Philips. He later married Judge Philip's daughter, Mary E., in October 1852.

In 1874, Childress purchased a home in Mufreesboro that was later known as the Childress-Ray House.
