= 1869 Tennessee gubernatorial election =

- August 5, 1869
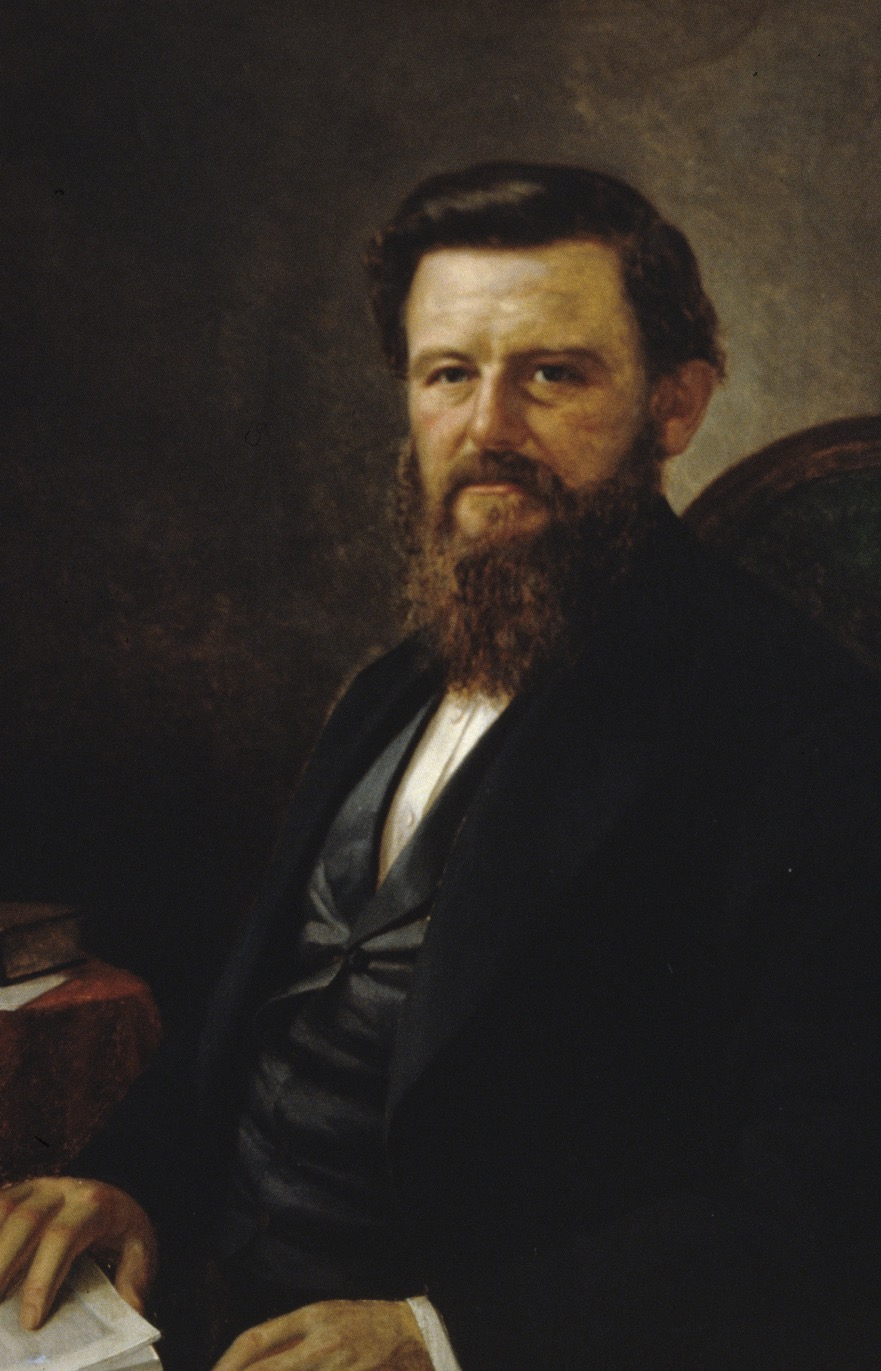

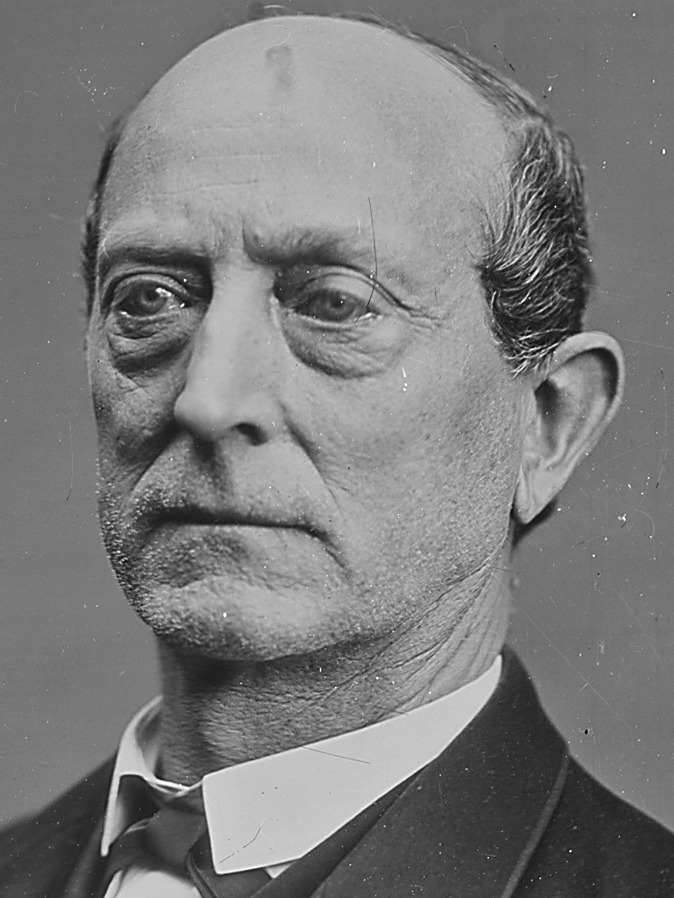
Nominee	Dewitt Clinton Senter	William Brickly Stokes
Party	Conservative Republican	Radical Republican
Popular vote	120,333	55,036
Percentage	68.62%	31.38%
- County results Senter: 50–60% 60–70% 70–80% 80–90% >90% Stokes: 50–60% 60–70% 70–80% 80–90% >90% No data
Governor before election
Dewitt Clinton Senter
Republican
Elected Governor
Dewitt Clinton Senter
Republican

The 1869 Tennessee gubernatorial election was held on August 5, 1869, to elect the next governor of Tennessee. The Conservative Republican candidate DeWitt Clinton Senter defeated the Radical Republican candidate William Brickly Stokes.

Incumbent Republican governor Parson Brownlow was elected to the United States Senate and resigned as governor on February 25, 1869. Senter, being the speaker of the Tennessee Senate, became governor following Brownlow's resignation.

The Tennessee Republican Party held its convention on February 25, 1869, and gave its gubernatorial nomination to Governor Senter.

Senter ran for a full term and easily defeated Stokes, the congressman from Tennessee's 3rd congressional district.

== Background ==
Senter initially supported the Radical Republican initiatives of Governor William G. Brownlow, which included the disfranchisement of ex-Confederates. In October 1867, he helped elect Brownlow to the United States Senate seat held by David T. Patterson, whose term was set to expire in March 1869. Brownlow resigned as governor on February 25, 1869, and departed for Washington, D.C. to take his seat in the Senate. Under the Tennessee Constitution, the speaker of the Senate is the first in the gubernatorial line of succession, and thus, Senter became governor following Brownlow's resignation.

Brownlow's radical policies of disfranchisement had left the state divided and had led to the rise of the Ku Klux Klan. In his inaugural address, Senter vowed to aggressively pursue the Klan and quell Klan violence. In May 1869, however, he disbanded the state guard, which had been fighting the Klan, but had become unpopular. He also announced he supported restoring the voting rights of former Confederates.

Since Brownlow was near the end of his term as governor when he resigned, Senter was thrust into an election campaign within a few weeks of taking office. His relatively lenient policies toward former Confederates led to a rift in the state's Radical Republican ranks, as many Radicals wanted to continue Brownlow's policies and feared retribution if ex-Confederates and Democrats should once again control the state. At the radicals' tumultuous convention on May 20, 1869, they were unable to agree on a candidate for governor. In subsequent separate conventions, the radicals favored continuing Brownlow's policies nominated William B. Stokes, and those who favored more lenient policies nominated Senter.

== General election ==
1869 Tennessee gubernatorial election
Party	Candidate	Votes	%	±%
Conservative Republican	Dewitt Clinton Senter (incumbent)	120,333	68.62	
Radical Republican	William Brickly Stokes	55,036	31.38	
Total votes		175,369	100.00	
