= Sarah Polk Fall =

Socialite and philanthropist

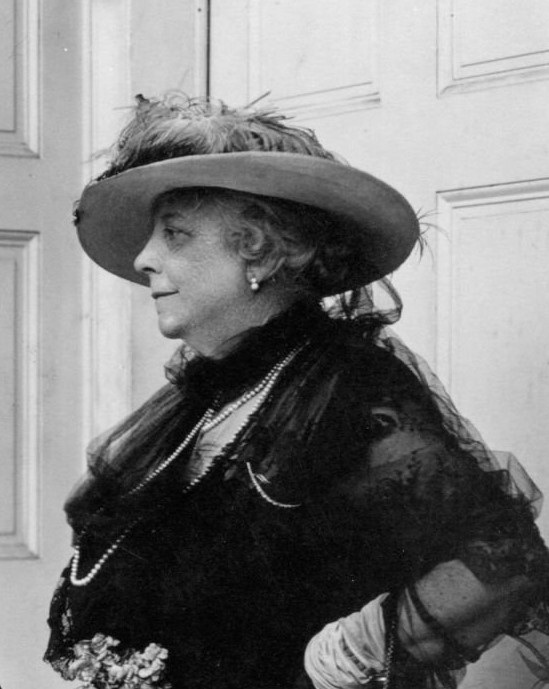
- Fall between 1915 and 1919
- Born: Sarah Polk Jetton; April 1, 1847; Rutherford County, Tennessee, U.S.
- Died: July 22, 1924 (aged 77); Nashville, Tennessee, U.S.
- Resting place: Mount Olivet Cemetery
- Known for: Fostered daughter of Sarah Childress Polk
- Spouse: George William Fall (m. 1865; died 1909)
- Children: Saidee Fall Grant (Note: Born Sarah Polk Fall, she was called Saidee to distinguish her from her mother and her mother's great-aunt. She was also known as Saidee Fall Gardner.)

Sarah Polk Jetton Fall (Note: Although she was born with the name "Sarah" she mostly went by Sallie. The Library of Congress uses the alternate spelling "Sally".) (April 1, 1847 – July 22, 1924) was a wealthy Nashville socialite and philanthropist. She was the great-niece and unofficially adopted daughter of former First Lady Sarah Childress Polk. Sallie's mother died when she was only a few months old. Sallie lived with her great-grandmother, who gave Sallie to her daughter Sarah after the death of Sarah's husband President James K. Polk.

Sallie was raised at the Polks' private residence Polk Place. She married George Fall in 1865, and they had a daughter Saidee. Sallie inherited the Polk estate upon Sarah's death in 1891, including several artifacts and papers from the late president which she later sold and donated to the Library of Congress. Sarah also willed some of the president's items to Saidee. Shortly before Sallie died in 1924, she and her daughter co-founded the James K. Polk Memorial Association. In 1929 Saidee worked with the state of Tennessee to acquire the president's home in Columbia which was then opened to the public as a museum.

== Biography ==
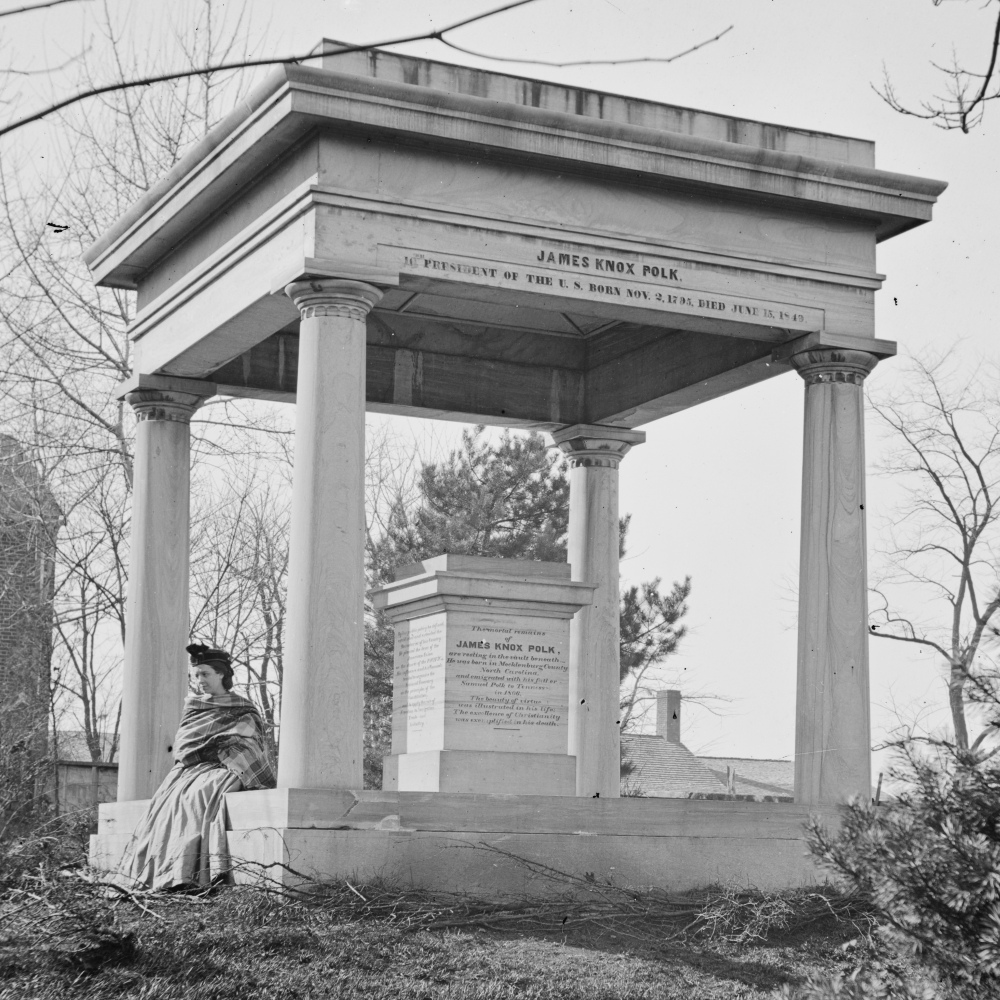
Sallie at the tomb of her great-uncle James K. Polk in 1864

Sallie Jetton was born in Rutherford County, Tennessee in 1847 to Mary Childress and Robert Jetton, a planter and land owner. Mary Childress was the daughter of Anderson Childress, the older brother of First Lady Sarah Childress Polk.

Sallie's mother died a few months after her birth from childbirth complications. Her father was unable to raise her alone, so she was taken in by her great-grandmother Elizabeth Childress. She stayed with her great-grandmother for a short period until the death of President James K. Polk in 1849. The president's wife Sarah mourned her husband's death deeply and became a recluse, rarely leaving her home Polk Place. Elizabeth, who was in her 70s, brought Sallie to Polk Place and suggested Sarah should care for her. Sarah agreed and assumed guardianship of Sallie after 1850.

Many who knew Sarah seemed skeptical of her bringing a child into her home. Judge John Catron would make the comment, "You are not the one Madam, to have charge of a little child; you, who have always been absorbed in the political and social affairs..." But nonetheless Sarah still assumed guardianship, and brought in a nurse and maid to watch the young girl. Sarah would often refer to Sallie as her daughter, and newspapers referred to Sallie as her adopted daughter. Sarah would take great pride in raising Sallie. Sallie stayed with Sarah for the rest of the former First Lady's life. In 1865, Sarah hosted Sallie's marriage to George Fall in the main Parlor of Polk Place. The newlyweds moved in with Sarah until after the birth of their child Saidee in 1868. Sarah greatly adored the little girl.

After Sarah's death in 1891 Sallie became the sole heir to the Polk estate as Sarah willed the Polk belongings, the contents of Polk Place along with the presidential papers to Sallie. Sarah bequeathed some of the personal items of the President to Sallie's daughter Saidee, including the president's watch and glasses. Sallie sold and donated the presidential papers to the Library of Congress in the early 1900s. She also donated one of Sarah's inaugural gowns and a fan to the Smithsonian. In 1905 Sallie opened her own home in Nashville for social gatherings to exhibit the items she had inherited from Sarah and to tell the legacy of her great-uncle president Polk. During these gatherings and other social events she would introduce herself as the daughter to the president. (Note: Throughout her life she seldom used her maiden name of Jetton, she always referred to herself as "Sarah Polk Fall".) Sallie continued living in Nashville after Sarah's death throughout her later life.

== Death and legacy ==
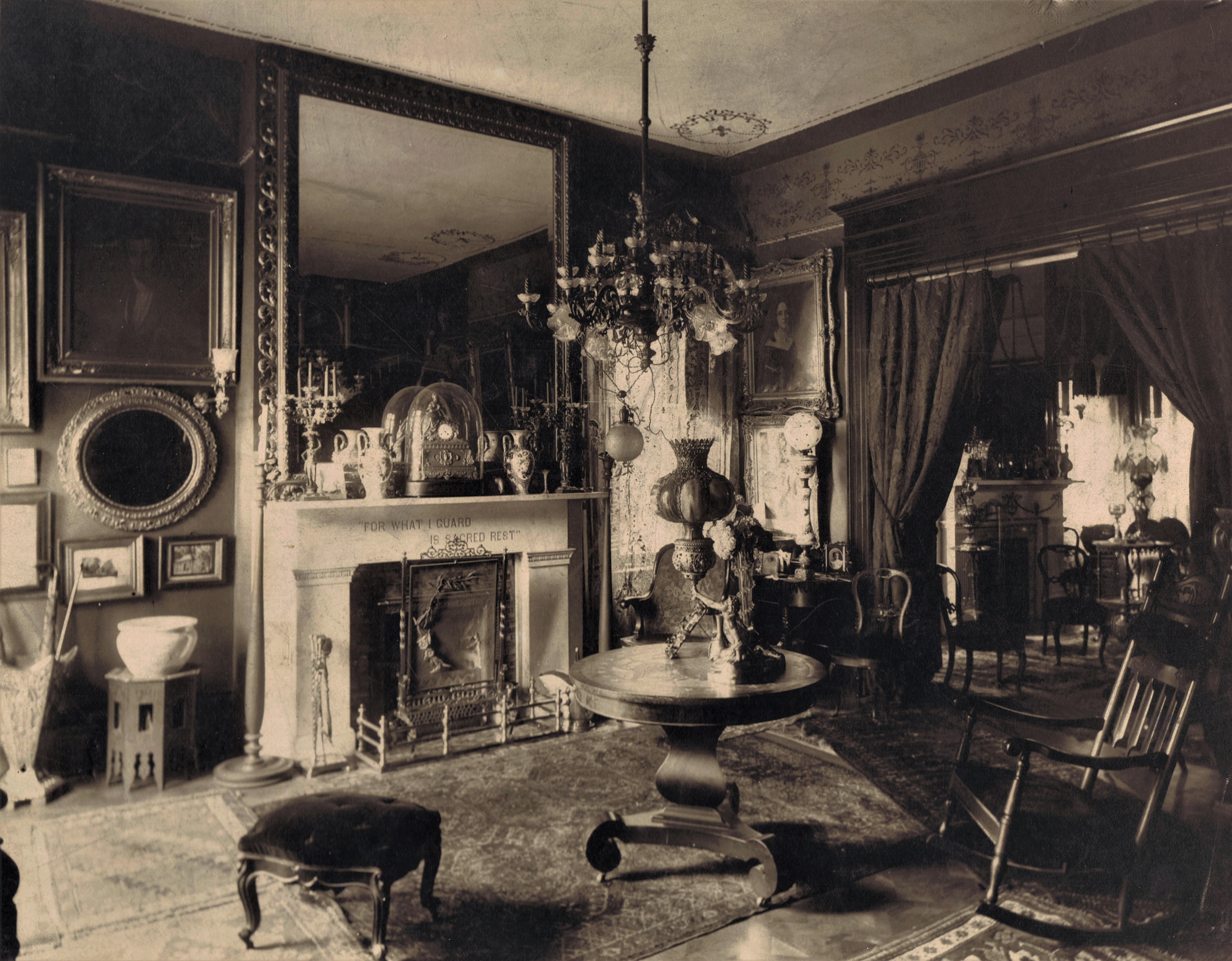
Sallie's home displaying items from Polk Place.

Sallie fell ill in 1924 and died July 22, at the age of 77. Newspapers throughout the country published "The Adopted daughter of President Polk Dies." The vast majority of the items she did not donate to the Library of Congress or the Smithsonian were left to her daughter, Saidee. Shortly before her death she helped her daughter Saidee found the James K. Polk Memorial Association along with other Nashville women, with the main intent of preserving the president's legacy.

In 1929 Sallie's daughter Saidee worked together with the state of Tennessee to purchase the only surviving private residence which the president lived in. The home, located in Columbia, Tennessee, was constructed by the president's father Samuel in 1816, and was the president's home for six years before his marriage to Sarah Childress in 1824. On acquisition of the home in 1929 The James K. Polk Memorial Association founded the James K. Polk Home, the presidential museum of James K. Polk. The contents of Polk Place that Sallie inherited and later left to her daughter Saidee would be brought to the museum. Later the fountain, the garden urns, and a gate from the exterior of Polk Place were moved to the property.
