= William H. Wisener =

American politician (1812–1882)

Speaker of the Tennessee House of Representatives
- In office 1853–1855
- Preceded by: Jordan Stokes
- Succeeded by: Neill S. Brown

Personal details
- Born: April 22, 1812 Bedford County, Tennessee, U.S.
- Died: December 24, 1882 (aged 70) Shelbyville, Tennessee, U.S.
- Resting place: Willow Mount Cemetery, Shelbyville, Tennessee, U.S.
- Party: Whig; Know Nothing; Opposition; Republican
- Profession: Attorney

William H. Wisener (April 22, 1812 – December 24, 1882) was an American politician, active primarily at the state level in Tennessee during the mid-19th century. He served four terms in the Tennessee House of Representatives (1847–1849, 1851–1855, and 1859–1861), including one term as Speaker (1853–1855). A Southern Unionist, he led the opposition to secession in the House on the eve of the Civil War. After the war, he served in the Tennessee Senate, where he introduced the 13th Amendment for ratification in April 1865.

Wisener was the Republican nominee for governor in 1870, but was defeated by the Democratic candidate, John C. Brown.

== Early life and career ==
Wisener was born in what is now Marshall County, Tennessee, which at the time was still part of Bedford County. He studied law, and moved to the county seat of Bedford, Shelbyville, in April 1835. He joined the burgeoning Whig Party around this time, and began publishing a pro-Whig newspaper, The People's Advocate, in 1836. He sold this paper in 1838 to focus on his law practice.

In 1847, Wisener ran for Bedford's seat in the Tennessee House of Representatives, and won by a narrow margin. As Bedford was almost evenly divided between Whigs and Democrats, all of Wisener's electoral victories prior to the Civil War were by margins of less than 200 votes out of about 3,000 cast. He did not seek a second consecutive term in 1849, but ran again in 1851, having received his party's nomination over former congressman Daniel L. Barringer, and was reelected in the general election. In his 1853 reelection bid, he defeated his Democratic challenger, E.N. Bobo, 1,278 votes to 1,103. He was elected Speaker in October 1853, defeating William Wallace of Blount County by a vote of 43–30.

Wisener supported funding for internal improvements, judicial reform, and tax reduction. He voted in favor of a failed prohibition measure in February 1854, and delivered a speech in support of a bill that would sell state-owned lands to fund public schools that same month. In March 1854, he voted for a resolution expressing the legislature's support for the Kansas-Nebraska Act.

Following the collapse of the Whig Party, Wisener, like many Tennessee Whigs, threw his support behind the American Party (Know Nothings). Though he didn't run for reelection after his third term in the House, he served as the 6th district elector for American Party presidential candidate Millard Fillmore in the 1856 presidential election. In May 1857, Wisener presided over the state's American Party convention in Nashville.

== Secession and the Civil War ==
In March 1859, Wisener represented Bedford County at the state convention of the Opposition Party, which had been formed by Unionists and former Whigs to oppose the rising separationist sentiments among Southern Democrats. That year, he once again sought Bedford's seat in the state house, and defeated his Democratic opponent by a slim margin. His assignments included the House Committee on Banks and the House Judiciary Committee.

Although bank reform dominated the first few days of the 1859 state legislative session, John Brown's raid on Harpers Ferry in October 1859 thrust the issue of slavery back to the forefront. While the pro-Union faction of the legislature was increasingly outnumbered, Wisener provided persistent opposition to secessionist initiatives throughout most of his term. In late November 1859, he attempted to amend a House resolution condemning Northern Republicans for destabilizing the Union to extend the blame to "disunionists" and "secessionists," arguing they were equally at fault. He "occupied nearly the whole of the morning session" on December 1 speaking in favor of this amendment, but it was eventually tabled. In January 1860, Wisener opposed a bill expelling free men of color from the state. In March 1860, he introduced a bill instructing the state's two U.S. senators to procure land in Mexico for the expelled free men of color, which failed.

The election of Abraham Lincoln to the presidency in November 1860 increased calls for secession, and the Tennessee state legislature called for a convention to consider secession in January 1861. Wisener was one of just five representatives to vote against holding this convention. He introduced a series of resolutions on January 8, 1861, stating that secession was unconstitutional and "a remedy for no existing evil." He argued the United States government was adequate for the protection of Southern states' rights.

While Tennessee voters rejected the secession convention in a statewide referendum in February 1861, the Battle of Fort Sumter reignited the debate. In late April, Wisener was one of six representatives to vote against a resolution approving of Governor Isham G. Harris's refusal to comply with President Lincoln's call for troops to put down the rebellion, and one of seven to vote against a bill authorizing Harris to raise three regiments for Confederate forces. Wisener attempted (unsuccessfully) to amend the latter bill to require that the troops be used specifically for the defense of the state. In May 1861, he voted against forming a military league with the Confederacy. After the state voted to secede on June 8, 1861, Wisener attempted to leave the legislature, but Governor Harris refused to accept his resignation. In subsequent days, Wisener voted for a number of measures that sustained the pro-Confederate actions of the state, including a bill that would provide a pay raise for the state's troops, and a bill authorizing the governor to arm and equip the new regiments. Though later assailed for these votes by political opponents, he defended them, arguing he was simply voting the will of Bedford County, which had become overwhelmingly secessionist.

After his tumultuous term ended in August 1861, Wisener returned to his home in Bedford County. When the Union Army regained control of Nashville in early 1862, Wisener spoke at a Union rally in the city, where he endorsed the state's new military governor, Andrew Johnson. In November 1862, Wisener organized a rally for the state's "Union refugees" living in Nashville. During the presidential campaign of 1864, Wisener canvassed the state as an at-large elector for President Lincoln.

== Tennessee Senate ==
In January 1865, Wisener spoke at a statewide Unionist convention that had been called for the purpose of reestablishing a state government. In March, he was elected to the state senate seat for Bedford and Marshall counties without campaigning. On April 5, 1865, Wisener introduced the bill in the state senate ratifying the Thirteenth Amendment to the United States Constitution, which passed unanimously. Wisener resigned his seat after just four weeks in office.

Wisener was among the candidates considered for one of the state's two U.S. Senate seats in May 1865. His record in the days following the Ordinance of Secession in 1861 came under scrutiny, and he was accused by opponents of "providing aid and comfort" to the enemy for his votes in favor of several pro-Confederate measures. Wisener dismissed the charges, and the Nashville Daily Union and a group of pro-Union Bedford Countians came to his defense. Nevertheless, his bid for the senate seat failed, with the legislature instead choosing Joseph S. Fowler.

Wisener was reelected to the state senate in 1867. He served as Chairman of the Senate Judiciary Committee, and was one of three members of a special committee that investigated the burgeoning Ku Klux Klan. Wisener supported the use of the state guard and federal troops to quell the Klan's rising influence. He also supported Governor William G. Brownlow's controversial decision to throw out hundreds of votes in the 4th district to aid his political ally, Samuel Arnell, arguing the Klan had interfered in the election.

Wisener opposed the state's 1870 constitution, arguing it wasn't strong enough in its recognition of Tennessee as a perpetual part of the Union. He was particularly opposed to the inclusion of a poll tax in the final document.

== 1870 campaign for governor ==
Wisener was nominated for the Tennessee Supreme Court on the Republican ticket in July 1870, but with former Confederates reenfranchised, he was badly defeated in the August general election (though he garnered the most votes of any Republican candidate). At the state Republican Party convention a month later, Wisener was nominated by fellow Bedford Countian James Mullins as the party's candidate for governor. The other potential nominees, among them Horace Maynard, John Trimble, and David Alexander Nunn, withdrew their names, allowing Wisener to win the nomination. Democrats nominated as their candidate former Confederate general John C. Brown.

The Republican platform endorsed the policies of President Ulysses S. Grant, called for the establishment of public schools, supported policies that encouraged immigration, opposed the repudiation of the state's debt, and demanded the enforcement of rights guaranteed by the Fourteenth and Fifteenth amendments. In his acceptance speech, Wisener attacked the 1870 constitution, and stated he would enforce all federal laws and would bring in federal soldiers if necessary. He also vowed to crush the Ku Klux Klan.

Much like Wisener's 1865 U.S. Senate opponents, Democrats rehashed his Tennessee House voting record from the days following the state's Ordinance of Secession in June 1861, and accused him of hypocrisy for attacking former Confederates on the secession issue. Wisener argued that his votes during that period were largely to provide better pay for Confederate soldiers, noting that he had always been a champion of the poor, and that the poor were the ones fighting in the war. The Knoxville Chronicle, a Republican newspaper, came to his defense, stating, "the Union people of the State are satisfied that he is now, and always has been, opposed to the doctrine of secession..." Another newspaper, The Fayetteville Observer, stated that Wisener's June 1861 voting record provided "no evidence of anything more than humanity," though it accused Wisener of charging the government outrageous legal fees during the Brownlow administration.

The two candidates engaged in a series of public debates in early October 1870. At one such debate in Knoxville, Brown attempted to show that Wisener had been a secessionist, going so far as to state he was induced to enter the Confederate Army due to Wisener's influence. He spoke in favor of states' rights, referring to the federal government as a "central despotism," and criticized the manner in which the Fourteenth and Fifteenth amendments had been ratified. In response, Wisener sarcastically stated that since he was now a "proven" rebel, he expected large numbers of Democratic votes in the election. He criticized Brown for not recording most of his votes at the 1870 constitutional convention, and noted that one of his few public votes had been for the poll tax.

On election day (November 8, 1870), Wisener, who had described his campaign as a "forlorn hope," was badly defeated, 78,979 to 41,500. It was the beginning of a long period of dominance in state politics by the Democratic Party. Republicans would control the governor's office for just two of the next forty years, and eight of the next one hundred years.

== Later life ==
In December 1870, a few weeks after Wisener's defeat in the race for governor, his son, William H. Wisener Jr. (1840–1880), was involved in a violent altercation with future Nashville Banner publisher, E.B. Stahlman (1843–1930). The two had been squabbling over a fee at the Southern Express Company, where Stahlman worked at the time, when Wisener Jr., drew a gun and shot Stahlman. A coworker of Stahlman then shot Wisener Jr., seriously wounding him. The younger Wisener was convicted of the assault and sentenced to prison, but was pardoned by Governor Dewitt Clinton Senter.

Although he never again held elected office, Wisener remained active in politics for the rest of his life. He was a delegate to the 1872 Republican National Convention in Philadelphia, and campaigned as an elector for President Grant later that year. Wisener ran for the 5th district seat in Congress in 1874, but was easily defeated by the Democratic incumbent, John Morgan Bright, 10,224 votes to 3,831. He unsuccessfully sought the Republican nomination for governor in 1876, and was a delegate to the 1880 Republican National Convention in Chicago.

Wisener worked as Shelbyville's postmaster during the last years of his life. He died on Christmas Eve, 1882. He is interred in Shelbyville's Willow Mount Cemetery.

Party political offices
Preceded by Dewitt Clinton Senter	Republican nominee for Governor of Tennessee; 1870	Succeeded by Alfred A. Freeman
