= William B. Stokes =

American politician (1814–1897)

William Brickly Stokes
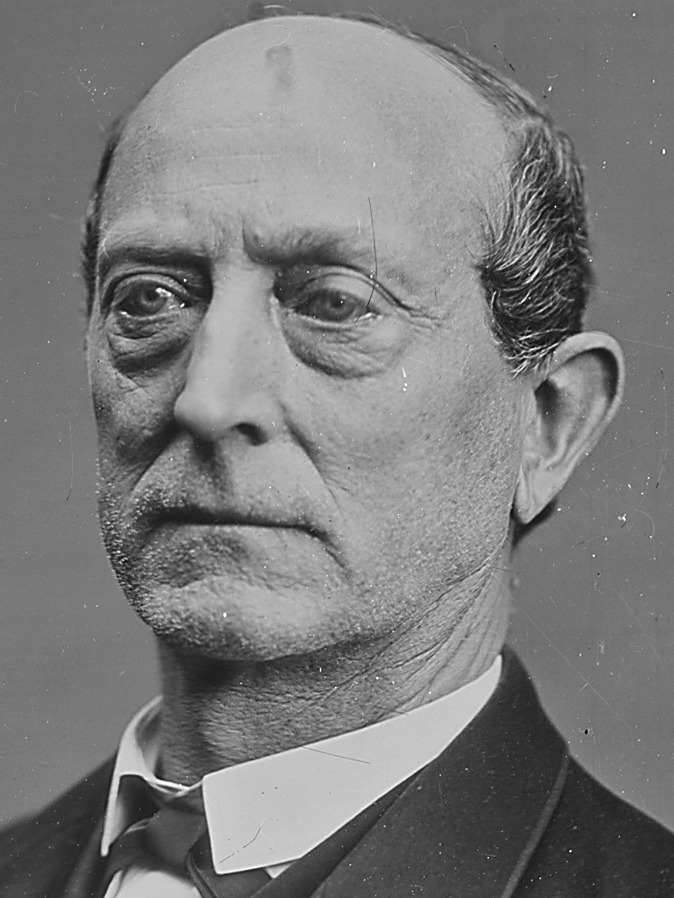

Member of the U.S. House of Representatives from Tennessee's 3rd district
- In office July 24, 1866 – March 3, 1871
- Preceded by: George Washington Bridges
- Succeeded by: Abraham Ellison Garrett

Member of the U.S. House of Representatives from Tennessee's 4th district
- In office March 4, 1859 – March 3, 1861
- Preceded by: John Houston Savage
- Succeeded by: Andrew Jackson Clements

Personal details
- Born: September 9, 1814 Chatham County, North Carolina, U.S.
- Died: March 14, 1897 (aged 82) Alexandria, Tennessee, U.S.
- Resting place: Eastview Cemetery, Alexandria, Tennessee
- Party: Unconditional Union

Military service
- Allegiance: United States of America; Union
- Branch/service: United States Army; Union Army
- Years of service: 1862–1865
- Rank: Colonel; Brevet Brigadier General
- Commands: 5th Tennessee Cavalry Regiment
- Battles/wars: American Civil War

William Brickly Stokes (September 9, 1814 – March 14, 1897) was an American politician and a member of the United States House of Representatives from Tennessee. He also served as colonel of the 5th Regiment Tennessee Volunteer Cavalry during the American Civil War.

== Biography ==
Hall was born on September 9, 1814, in Chatham County, North Carolina. He attended the common schools, moved with his family to Temperance Hall, Tennessee, and engaged in agricultural pursuits. He was a member of the Tennessee House of Representatives from 1849 to 1852. He served in the Tennessee Senate in 1855 and 1856. Stokes owned between seven and ten enslaved people in Tennessee.

Stokes was elected as a member of the Opposition Party to the Thirty-sixth Congress by Tennessee's 4th congressional district, serving from March 4, 1859, to March 4, 1861. He entered the Union Army on May 15, 1862, as a major of the Tennessee Volunteers. He served as colonel of the 5th Regiment Tennessee Volunteer Cavalry until he resigned on March 10, 1865. He briefly served in temporary brigade command in the Army of the Ohio between June 17, 1863, and August 6, 1863. On December 24, 1866, President Andrew Johnson nominated Stokes for the award of the honorary grade of brevet brigadier general to rank from March 13, 1865. The U.S. Senate confirmed the award on February 21, 1867. He studied law, was admitted to the bar in 1867, and commenced practice in Alexandria, Tennessee, in DeKalb County, Tennessee.

Upon the readmission of Tennessee to representation, he was elected as an Unconditional Unionist to the Thirty-ninth Congress by Tennessee's 3rd congressional district. He was re-elected as a Republican to the Fortieth and Forty-first Congresses. He served in the U.S. House of Representatives from July 24, 1866, to March 4, 1871. He was an unsuccessful candidate for re-election in 1870 to the Forty-second Congress. He also was the supervisor of internal revenue for Tennessee. He resumed the practice of law and died in Alexandria, Tennessee, on March 14, 1897. He was interred in East View Cemetery at Alexandria.

== See also ==
- List of American Civil War brevet Generals (Union)

Party political offices
First	Radical Republican nominee for Governor of Tennessee; 1869	Succeeded by None
U.S. House of Representatives
Preceded by John Houston Savage	Member of the U.S. House of Representatives from Tennessee's 4th congressional district March 4, 1859 - March 3, 1861	Succeeded by Andrew Jackson Clements
Preceded by George Washington Bridges	Member of the U.S. House of Representatives from Tennessee's 3rd congressional district July 24, 1866 - March 3, 1871	Succeeded by Abraham Ellison Garrett
