= Palk (surname) =

Palk is a surname. Notable people with the surname include:

- Anna Palk (1941–1990), English actress
- Lawrence Palk, 1st Baron Haldon (1818–1883), British politician
- Robert Palk (1717–1798), British priest and politician
- Stan Palk (1921–2009), English footballer

== See also ==
- Pall (name)
