= William Polk =

William Polk is the name of:

- William Polk (colonel) (1758–1834), American Revolutionary War officer, politician and bank president
- William Benjamin Polk (1930–2014), American state representative
- William Hawkins Polk (1815–1862), American congressman
- William J. Polk (c. 1808–1863), American politician
- William M. Polk (born 1936), American politician
- William Mecklenburg Polk (1844–1918), American physician
- William R. Polk (born 1929), foreign policy consultant and author
