= Childress-Ray House =

Historic house in Tennessee, United States

- U.S. National Register of Historic Places
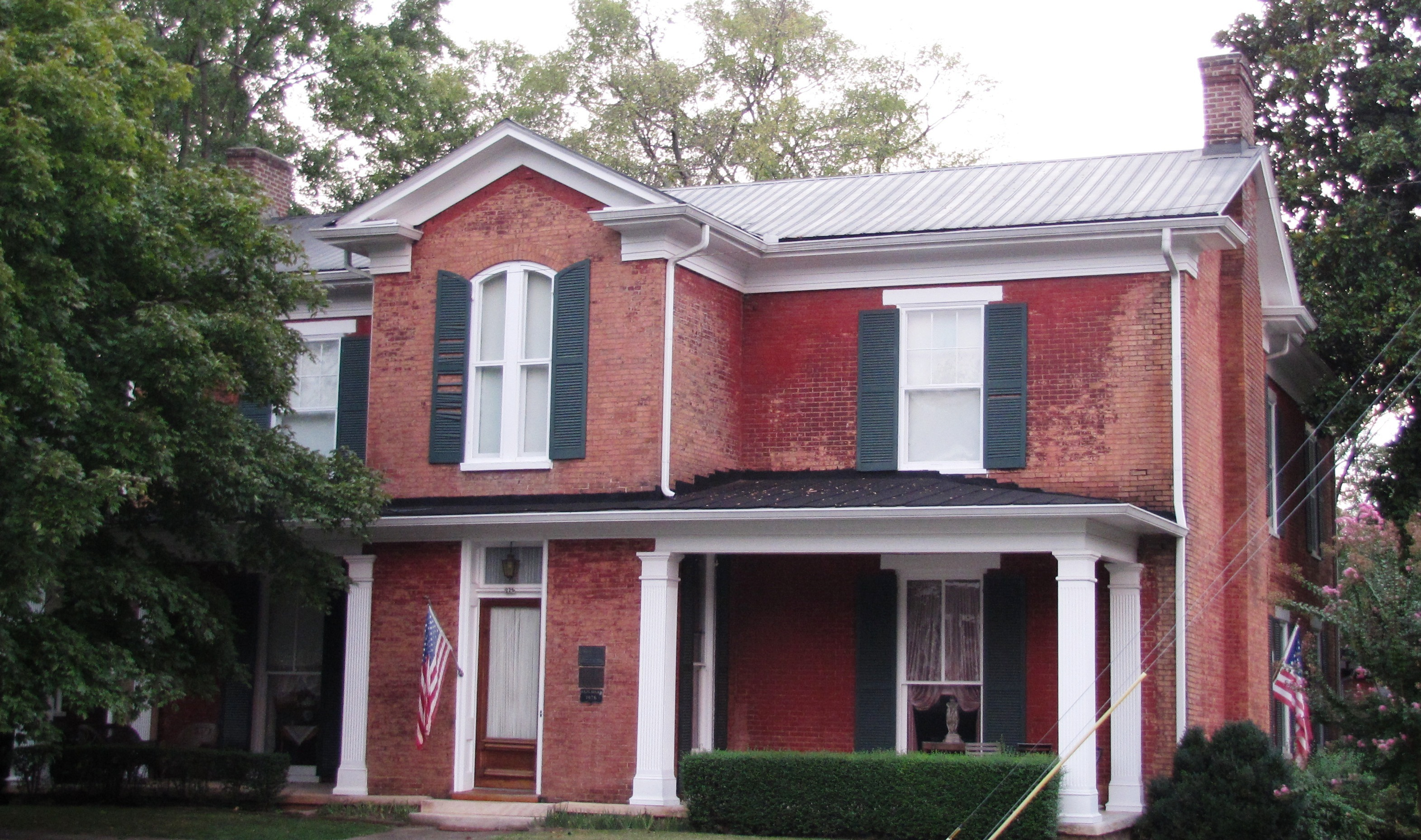
- The Childress-Ray House in 2010

- Location within Tennessee Location within the United States
- Location: 225 North Academy Street, Murfreesboro, Tennessee
- Coordinates: 35°50′51.61″N 86°23′19.93″W
- Area: 0.4 acres (0.16 ha)
- Built: 1847
- Built by: Jim Fletcher
- Architectural style: Greek Revival, Italianate
- NRHP reference No.: 79002458
- Added to NRHP: December 27, 1979

The Childress-Ray House is a historic house in Murfreesboro, Tennessee, United States. It was built in 1847. In 1874, it was purchased by John W. Childress, the brother of U.S. First Lady Sarah Childress Polk, brother-in-law of U.S. President James K. Polk, and the father-in-law of Tennessee Governor John C. Brown. Former First Lady Sarah Polk was a frequent visitor.

The house was first designed in the Greek Revival architectural style, and later remodelled in the Italianate architectural style. It has been listed on the National Register of Historic Places since December 27, 1979.
