= Polk Place =

Former home of U.S. President James K. Polk and his wife

Coordinates: 36.1631°N 86.7838°W

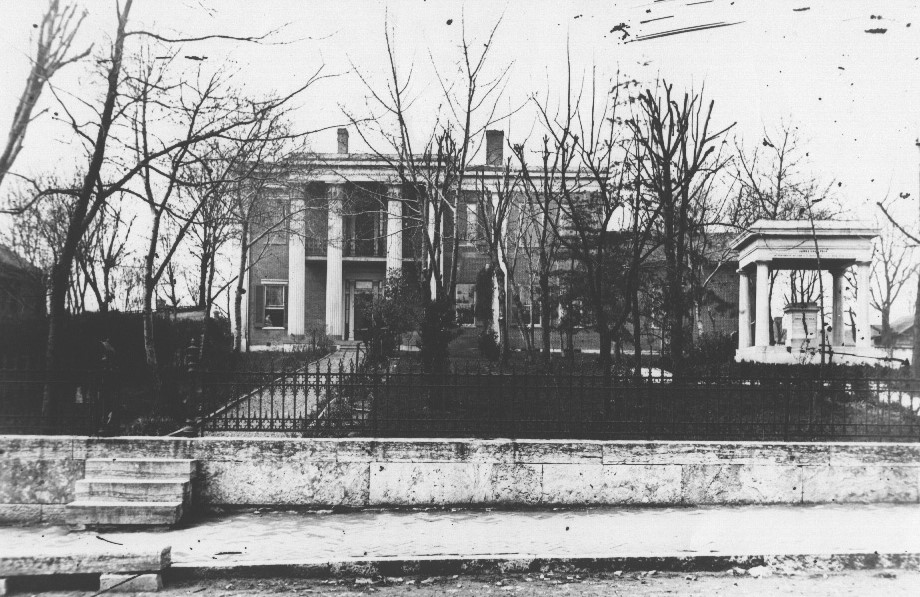
Polk Place in the late 19th century

Polk Place was the home of the 11th president of the United States, James K. Polk and his wife Sarah Childress Polk, originally on Vine Street in Nashville, Tennessee, before it was demolished in 1901.

== History and description ==
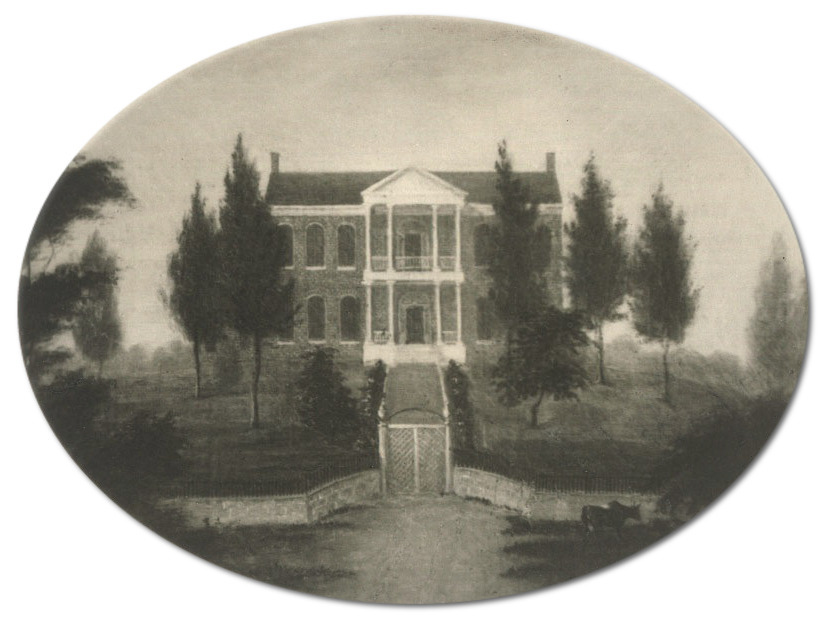
Original shown as Grundy Place

The home originally called "Grundy Place" was constructed for Attorney General Felix Grundy between 1815 and 1820 in the Palladian style of architecture, Grundy lived in the home until his death in 1840. President Polk purchased the home while living in the White House in 1847, renaming it "Polk Place". Polk contracted Nashville architect J.M. Hughes to renovate the home for the time when he and Sarah would return to Tennessee after the end of his presidency.

In the processes of modifying and renovating the home the back portion was destroyed by an accidental gunpowder explosion in 1847. With repairs underway the President wanted a more modern style, and requested Hughes to redesign the home in the Greek Revival style of architecture. Sarah Polk went to inspect the construction and repairs of the home in early 1848 for their return.

Upon returning to Tennessee in 1849, James and Sarah Polk went to his mother's home in Columbia before returning to Nashville two weeks later, when Polk Place was finished. It was the President's final residence, where he died of cholera at age 53, only three months after leaving office. He had lived in the home for between thirty and fifty days. After his death his wife continued to reside there for 42 years until her death in 1891. The home was demolished in 1901, a decade after her death.

== After President Polk's death ==
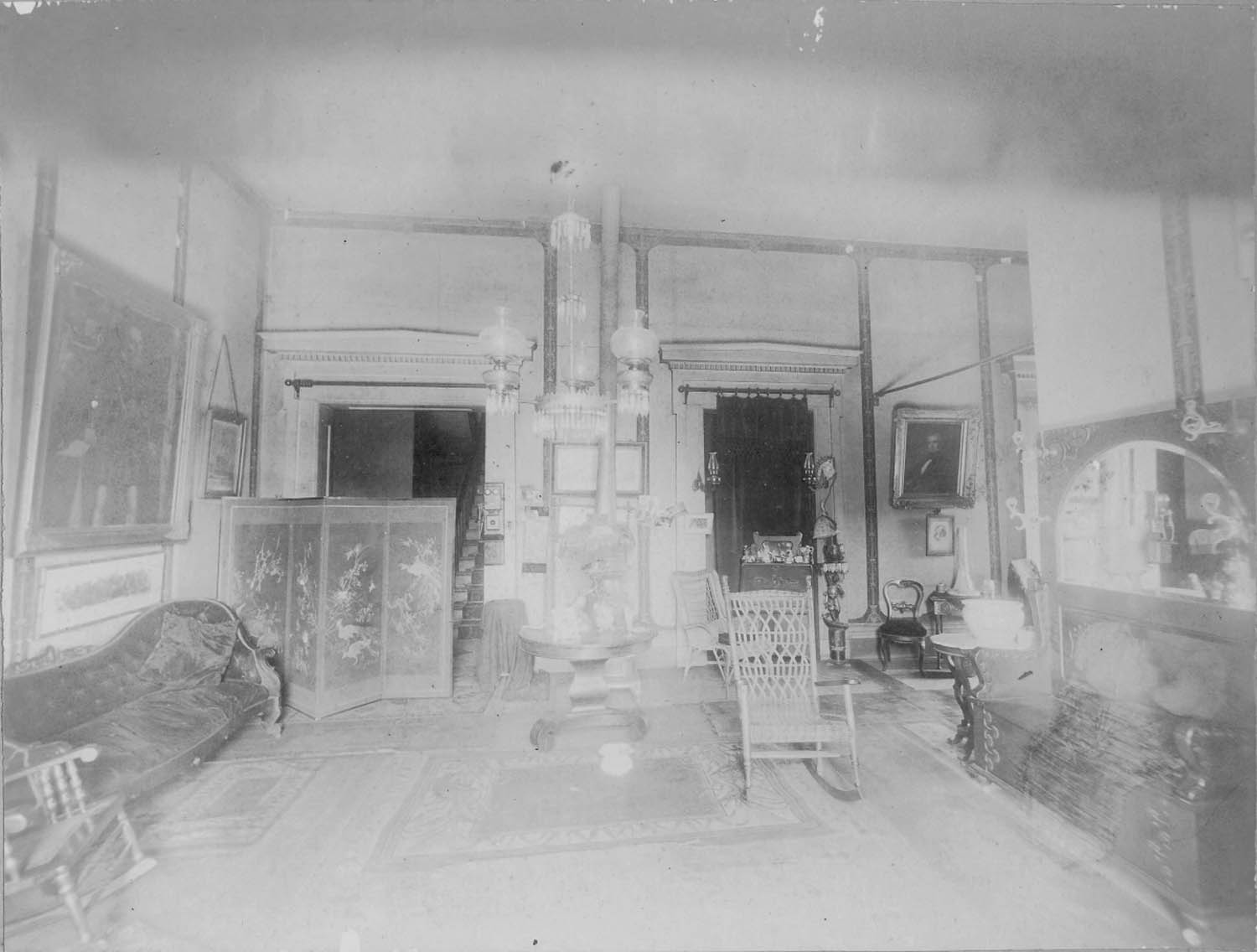
Foyer of Polk Place.

After the president's death first lady Sarah Polk lived in the home. She became a recluse for some time, barely leaving the mansion. She did not find solace until fostering a great niece, Sarah Polk Jetton in the early 1850s. Soon she opened her home back up for invitations and hosting guests along with the occasional event. She hosted distinguished and popular guests throughout her widowhood, including her close friend Adelicia Acklen, Abram Hewitt, Edward Cooper, John C. Calhoun II, John Catron, George Bancroft, Cyrus Field, William Vanderbilt, Sam Houston, and presidents Andrew Johnson, Rutherford B. Hayes and Grover Cleveland.

During the Civil War, Polk Place was considered neutral ground by both the Confederate and Union armies, despite the fact that Sarah Polk had nephews fighting on the Confederate side. Union generals Ulysses S. Grant and Don Carlos Buell frequently paid their respects to the former first lady, as had Confederate generals briefly before the Union occupation.

At the end of the war, Sarah Polk Jetton was married in the main parlor of Polk Place to a wealthy Nashville merchant, George Fall.

== Legal dispute ==
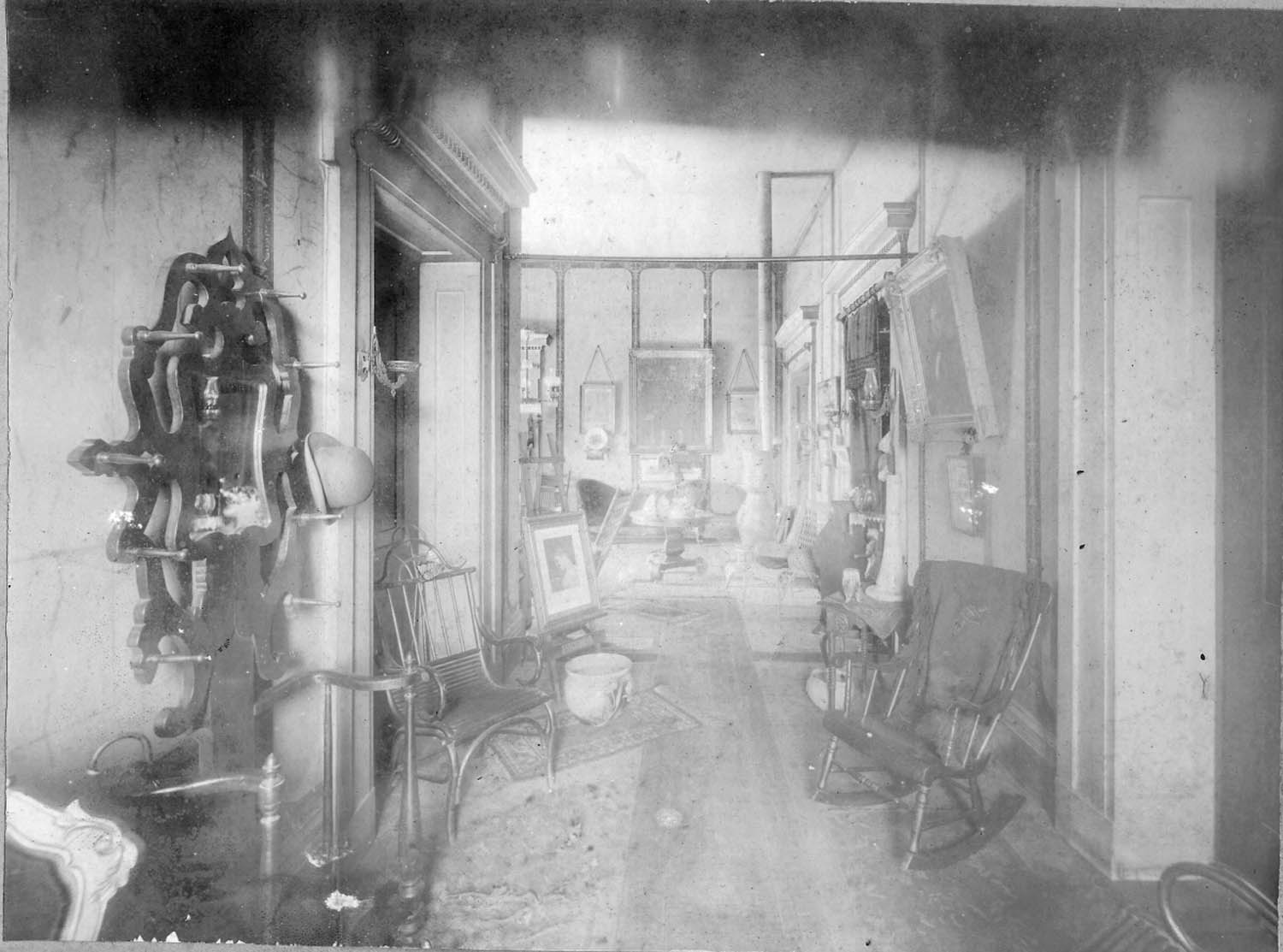
Hallway of Polk Place

After a short illness, Sarah Polk died at Polk Place in 1891, just short of her 88th birthday. Originally her will was followed, giving sole ownership of the home and its estate to her great niece Sarah Polk (Jetton) Fall, allowing her to live in the mansion for a few years after Sarah Polk's death. What followed, however, was a long legal dispute brought by other Polk relatives, who claimed Sarah Polk's will was invalid and the perpetuity in President Polk's will had gone into effect; that he could not foresee that far into the future. The president's nephew Tasker Polk, son of his brother William Hawkins Polk, was the one who led the legal battle against Sarah Polk Fall.

A judge ruled in favor of Tasker Polk and the Polk family, giving control of the home to them. President Polk's tomb was originally located on the front lawn until 1893, when it was moved to the Tennessee State Capitol. The Polk family could not agree on what to do with the home and did not want to follow the president's will, in which he expressed desire that a worthy and noble Polk relative run the home like the Hermitage. The state of Tennessee nearly acquired Polk Place and made it the governor's mansion. (At the time, the governor of Tennessee stayed in a hotel room.)

Finally, the state Supreme Court ordered the Polk family to sell the home and evenly split the money from the sale in 1900. Tasker would sell the home to Jacob M. Dickinson who then sold it to a developer and the mansion was demolished in 1901 to build a small apartment building.

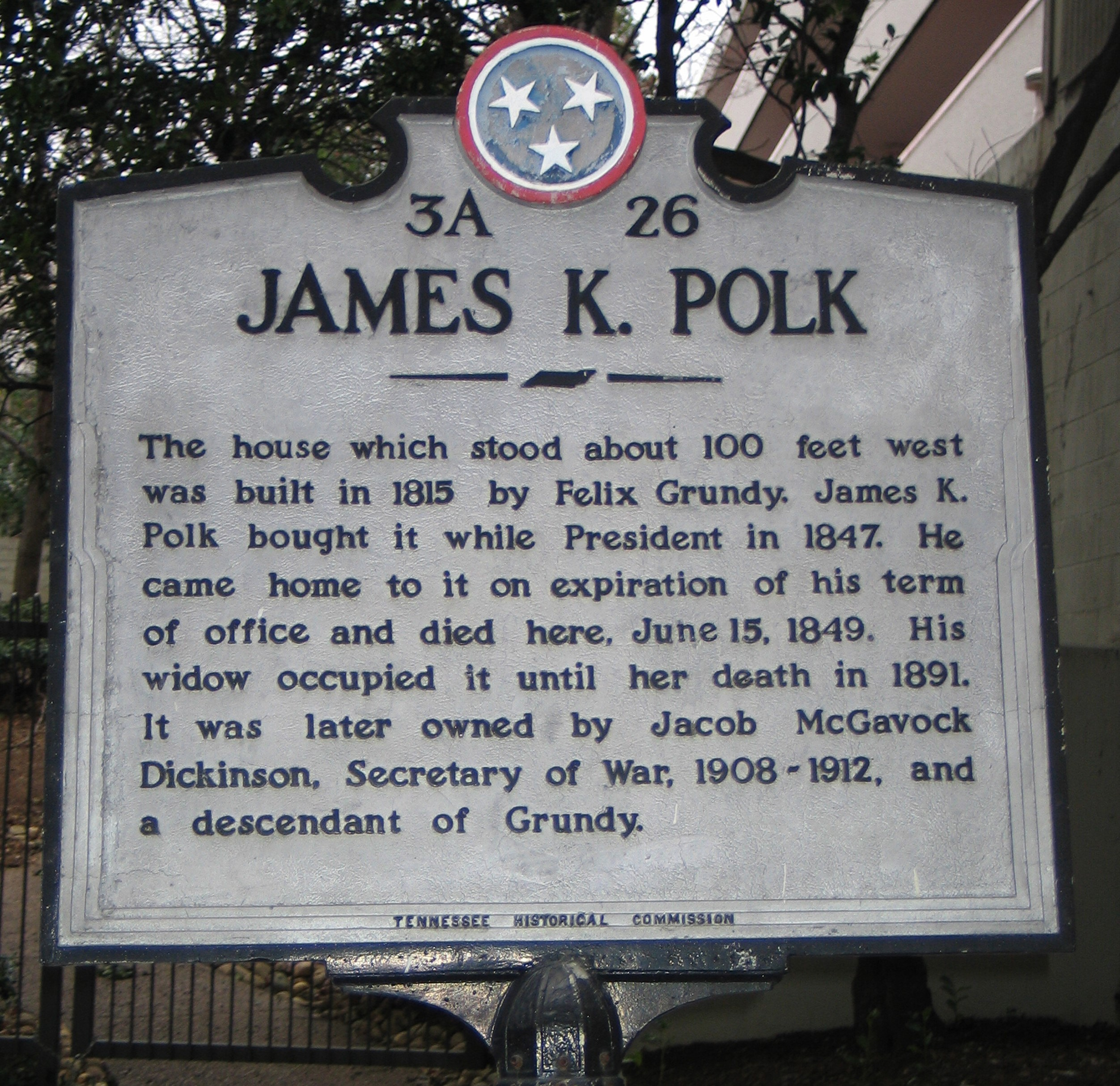
Tennessee Historical Commission Marker on site where Polk Place once stood.

== Today ==
The site has changed hands many times over the years. The YWCA bought the property in 1909 and built a new state-of-the-art facility. They sold the building in 1978 and moved to Woodmont Avenue. The Capitol Hotel (formerly Best Western) now occupies the former site of Polk Place in downtown Nashville.

An iron fountain, garden urns, and gate were preserved from the property and are now located at the President James K. Polk Home & Museum in Columbia.

== See also ==
- President James K. Polk Home & Museum, Polk's young adult home in Columbia, Tennessee
