= Sarah Childress Polk =

First Lady of the United States from 1845 to 1849

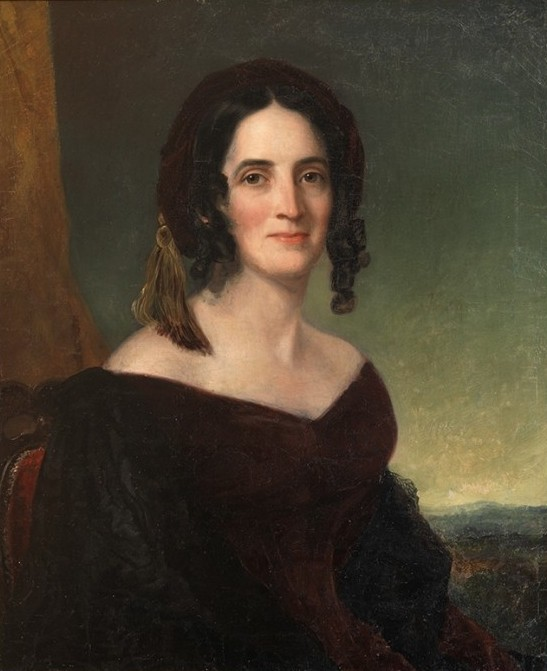
- Portrait, 1845

First Lady of the United States
- In role March 4, 1845 – March 4, 1849
- President: James K. Polk
- Preceded by: Julia Gardiner Tyler
- Succeeded by: Margaret Taylor

First Lady of Tennessee
- In role October 14, 1839 – October 15, 1841
- Governor: James K. Polk
- Preceded by: Rachel Cannon
- Succeeded by: Sarah Jones

Personal details
- Born: Sarah Childress; September 4, 1803 Murfreesboro, Tennessee, U.S.
- Died: August 14, 1891 (aged 87) Nashville, Tennessee, U.S.
- Resting place: Tennessee State Capitol; Nashville, Tennessee, U.S.
- Spouse: James Polk (m. 1824; died 1849)
- Relations: John W. Childress (brother); Elizabeth Childress Brown (niece); Sarah Polk Fall (grandniece)
- Education: Salem Academy

Sarah Childress Polk (née Childress; September 4, 1803 – August 14, 1891) was the first lady of the United States from 1845 to 1849. She was the wife of the 11th president of the United States, James K. Polk.

Well educated in a successful family, Sarah met her future husband at a young age. They never had children of their own though they fostered relatives. Socially keen and well informed, Sarah helped her husband's career with her hosting skills and advised him on political matters at times, but she stayed out of the public limelight. Following her husband's death in 1849, Sarah had a 42-year widowhood, the longest of any First Lady.

== Early life and education ==
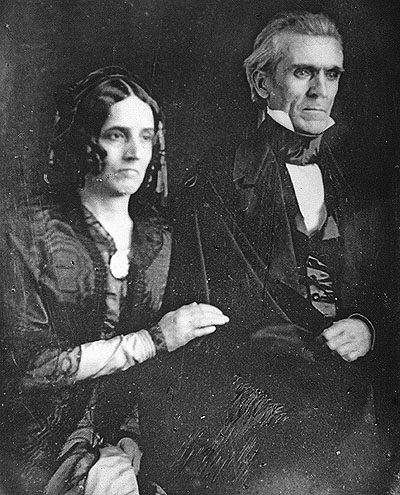
Sarah and James K. Polk, c. 1848–1849

Sarah Childress was born in 1803 to Elizabeth Whitsitt and Joel Childress, a prominent planter, merchant, and land speculator—the third of their six children. She was well educated for a woman of her time and place, attending the exclusive Moravians' Salem Academy in Winston-Salem, North Carolina in 1817, one of the few institutions of higher learning available to women in the early 19th century.

Sarah Childress met James K. Polk while both were receiving instruction from Samuel P. Black at his house in Murfreesboro, Tennessee; he was 19, she was 12. They would be formally introduced in the early 1820s with Polk's involvement with the State Legislature. Shortly after he began courting her, legend says Andrew Jackson called her "wealthy, pretty, ambitious, and intelligent," and urged Polk to marry her. In 1823 the two became engaged, and on January 1, 1824, Sarah Childress, aged 20, married James Polk, aged 28, at the plantation home of the bride's parents near Murfreesboro.

They remained married for 25 years, and never had children. This is often attributed to the bladder stone surgery Polk had as a young man, which is thought to have made him sterile. They were the only presidential couple to never have children while together, biologically, adopted or from a previous marriage. They raised his nephew, Marshall Tate Polk (1831–1884), as their ward for a few years before James sent him to a school in Washington, D.C., and later Georgetown University. After her husband's death, Sarah would foster her grand-niece, Sarah Polk Fall (1847–1924).

== Years of political life (1825–1849) ==
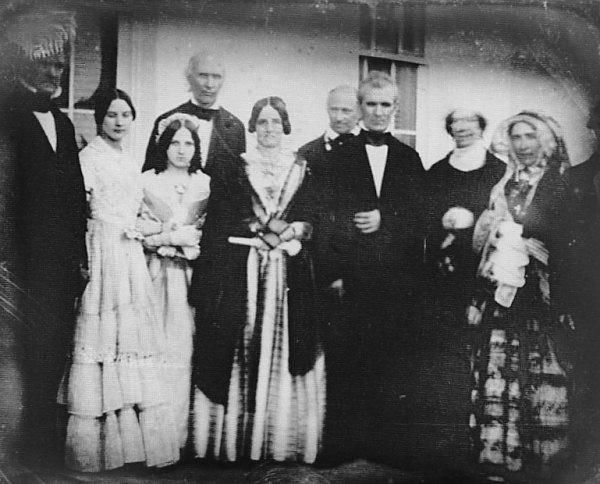
The Polks on the portico of the White House alongside Secretary of State James Buchanan, and former first lady Dolley Madison.

During his political career, Polk assisted her husband with his speeches, using her insight to guide his outlines and provide needed assurance. She accompanied her husband as often as she could whenever he made trips to Washington and made sure to take an active political role. She even copied down his correspondence and developed notable social skills. Mrs. Polk was not a woman who chose to proclaim her sentiment openly, striving to maintain a humble demeanor. It was her husband himself who declared that his most active supporter and critic was his wife. She also gave him advice on policy matters and played an active role in his campaigns. Mrs. Polk maintained correspondence with national leaders gaining access to global issues that were relevant to her husband's campaign.

She was one of the first president's wives to take an active role in her husband's electoral process and campaign itself. Not only did she keep up with this measure of communication, but she also wrote for a local newspaper expressing her support for James Polk's administration and his proposed policy initiatives. One of the more controversial topics she was able to write about was on the idea of expansionism which delved into the concept of manifest destiny pertaining to the United States' rights as a sovereign power. In Washington as a congressman's wife during the administrations of John Quincy Adams, Andrew Jackson, and Martin Van Buren, Polk very much enjoyed her social duties. Mrs. Polk was a religious woman who openly refused to dance, attend horse races, or theater. She took great pride in being a sociable woman but maintained a great sense of integrity. Though she did not drink herself, she made sure to serve a decadent selection of drinks and assorted foods during promotional dinners being the queen of hospitality. She was a woman who "enjoyed wide popularity as well as deep respect". In 1830 she risked a breach with Jackson, her husband's mentor, by taking part in the social ostracism of Peggy Eaton, during the Petticoat affair, although she continued to greet Eaton, unlike Vice President John C. Calhoun's wife, Floride Calhoun, and most of the cabinet members' wives.

In 1845, Sarah Polk became the 11th First Lady of the United States. She was lively, charming, intelligent, and a good conversationalist. President Polk at times discussed policy matters with her. While she enjoyed politics, she also cautioned her husband, whose health was never robust, against overwork. A devout Presbyterian, as First Lady she banned dancing, card games, and hard liquor at official receptions. Unlike Julia Tyler's waltzes, the Polk entertainments were sedate and sober affairs which earned the First Lady the nickname "Sahara Sarah". Although some accounts stated that the Polks never served wine, a Congressman's wife "recorded in her diary details of a four-hour dinner for forty at the White House—glasses for six different wines, from pink champagne to ruby port and sauterne, 'formed a rainbow around each plate.'"

== Later life ==
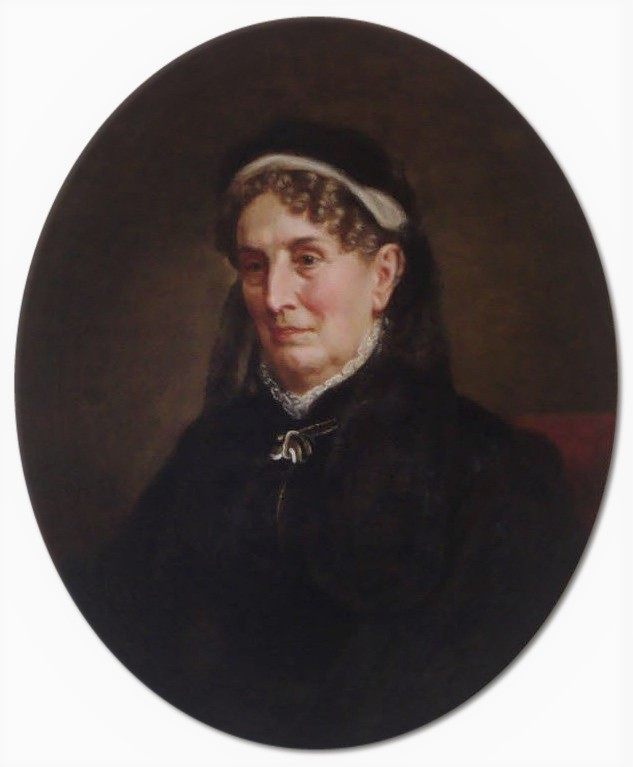
Polk in her later years

After attending the inauguration of Zachary Taylor on March 5, 1849, Polk and her husband left by horse and carriage to their new home, Polk Place, in Nashville, Tennessee. Upon arriving in Tennessee, to Polk's disappointment, Polk Place was not yet fully finished. They then went from Nashville to Columbia to spend two weeks with her mother-in-law before going to spend a few days in Murfreesboro with her family before returning to Nashville. Three months later, James Polk died of cholera, having had the shortest retirement of any U.S. president. He was 53 years old. Polk remained in Polk Place throughout these later years of her widowhood rarely leaving, becoming a bit of a recluse. She did not start hosting guests until a few years after her husband's death. She hosted distinguished and popular guests throughout her widowhood, such as Abram Hewitt, Edward Cooper, John C. Calhoun II, John Catron, George Bancroft, among numerous others, including Presidents Rutherford B. Hayes and Grover Cleveland.

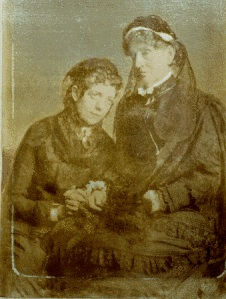
Sarah with her niece, Sallie

Once widowed, Polk unofficially adopted a grandniece, Sarah Polk Jetton, nicknamed "Sallie" (1847–1924), and saw her as her own daughter. After Polk's niece died, she was brought to live with Polk. They lived together in Nashville until Polk's death in 1891 at the age of 87.

Polk faced small financial difficulties throughout her widowhood. Her primary form of income was coming in through a plantation she inherited from her husband. She was forced to sell the plantation before the Civil War in 1861. Later she received money through her younger brother John W. Childress. Starting in 1884 the United States government granted Sarah a pension of $5,000 (~$179,167 in 2025) a year until her death.

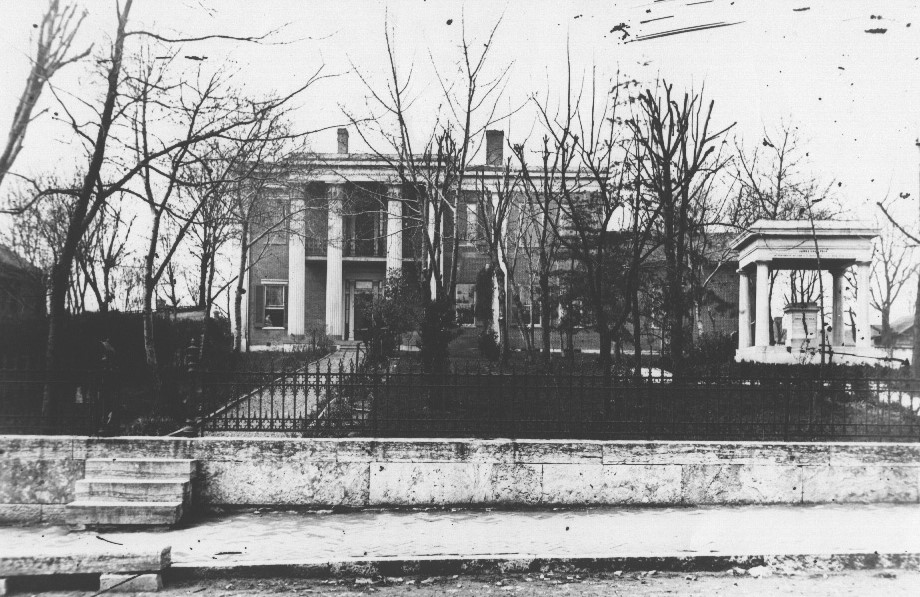
Polk Place

During the American Civil War, Polk was officially neutral, but she indicated sentiments in favor of preserving the Union during periodic visits to her home by several Union Army commanders, including Don Carlos Buell, George Henry Thomas, Ulysses S. Grant, and William Tecumseh Sherman. However, as a traditional Southern woman she also gave mention to Confederate sympathies during visits from Confederate generals in Nashville where Sarah would spend over 42 years of her widowhood. Sarah Polk lived at Polk Place for 42 years, the longest widowhood of any US first lady, and the longest retirement until Frances Cleveland exceeded her in 1939, and Rosalynn Carter (briefly) in 2023. As a true Victorian widow, Sarah always wore black in public. She visited her brother at his Childress-Ray House in Murfreesboro, whose daughter, Elizabeth Childress Brown, was married to Tennessee Governor John C. Brown. She also frequently visited her close friend Adelicia Acklen at Belmont.

== Death ==
Polk died on August 14, 1891, at age 87. She was originally buried next to her husband at their home in Nashville and was later reinterred with him at the Tennessee State Capitol when Polk Place was demolished in 1901. Polk left the contents of Polk Place to her grandniece, Sarah Polk Fall.

Honorary titles
Preceded by Julia Tyler	First Lady of the United States; 1845–1849	Succeeded by Margaret Taylor
