= Brownlow's Whig =

19th century US newspaper

The Whig
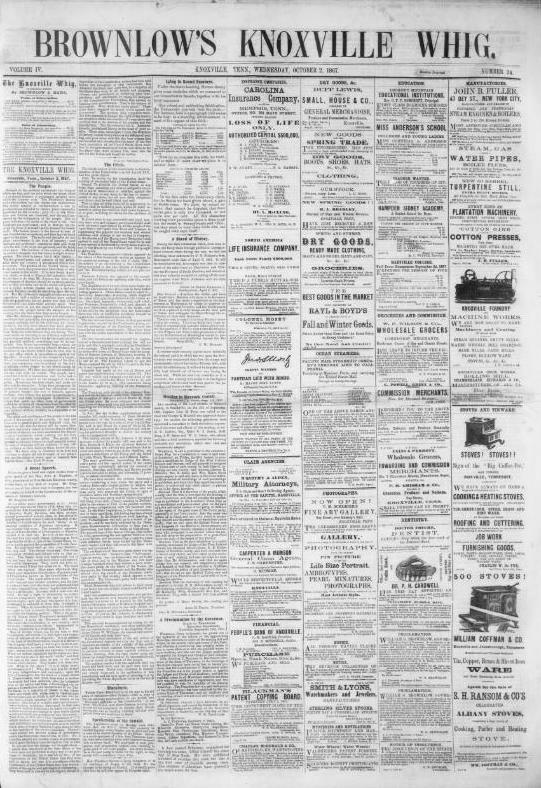
- The front page of the October 2, 1867, edition of Brownlow's Knoxville Whig.
- Type: Weekly newspaper
- Format: Broadsheet
- Founder(s): William G. Brownlow; Mason R. Lyon
- Publisher: William G. Brownlow (1840 – 1869); Mason R. Lyon (1839–1840); Valentine Garland (1840); C.P. Byers (1845 – 1847); J.W. O'Brien (1849 – 1855); E.B.P. Kinslow (1855 – 1861); T. Haws and Company (1867 – 1869); Joseph A. Mabry (1869 – 1870); Saunders and Clark (1870–1871).
- Editor: William G. Brownlow (1839-1865); John B. Brownlow (1865-1869); Thomas H. Pearne (1869); C. W. Charlton (1869-1870)
- Ceased publication: 1871
- Political alignment: Whig (1839–1854); Know Nothing (1856); Constitutional Union (1860); Radical Republican (1863–1869); Democratic Party (1869)
- Language: English
- Headquarters: Elizabethton, Tennessee (1839–1840); Jonesborough, Tennessee (1840–1849); Knoxville, Tennessee (1849–1871)
- Circulation: 10,000 (appx.)
- Sister newspapers: Knoxville Journal
- OCLC number: 60582333

The Whig was a polemical American newspaper published and edited by William G. "Parson" Brownlow (1805–1877) in the mid-nineteenth century. As its name implies, the paper's primary purpose was the promotion and defense of Whig Party political figures and ideals. In the years leading up to the Civil War, the Whig became the mouthpiece for East Tennessee's anti-secessionist movement. The Whig was published under several names throughout its existence, namely the Tennessee Whig, the Elizabethton Whig. the Jonesborough Whig, the Knoxville Whig, and similar variations.

The Whig was one of the most influential newspapers in nineteenth-century Tennessee, due mainly to Brownlow's editorials, which often included vindictive personal attacks and fierce diatribes. A Methodist circuit rider by trade, Brownlow partnered with publisher Mason R. Lyon under a one-year contract and launched the Whig on May 4, 1839 to counter rising Democratic sentiment in the region. He quickly made many enemies across the majority Democratic antebellum South. During his career, Brownlow survived several assassination attempts, numerous libel lawsuits, and arrest and imprisonment by Confederate authorities during the American Civil War.

Brownlow's Whig editorials attacked Democrats and Methodism's two main competitors in East Tennessee: Baptists and Presbyterians. Brownlow also attacked groups who he believed supported Democrats, such as Catholics, Mormons, and immigrants. In spite of its anti-secessionist sentiments, the Whig was staunchly pro-slavery in the early days of the Civil War but, upon Brownlow's return from exile in 1863, the paper adopted an abolitionist stance. After Brownlow was elected governor in 1865, his son became publisher of the Whig. In 1870, Whig reporter William Rule (1839–1928) launched the Knoxville Chronicle (later renamed Knoxville Journal), which is often considered the "successor" to the Whig.

== Layout and publication ==
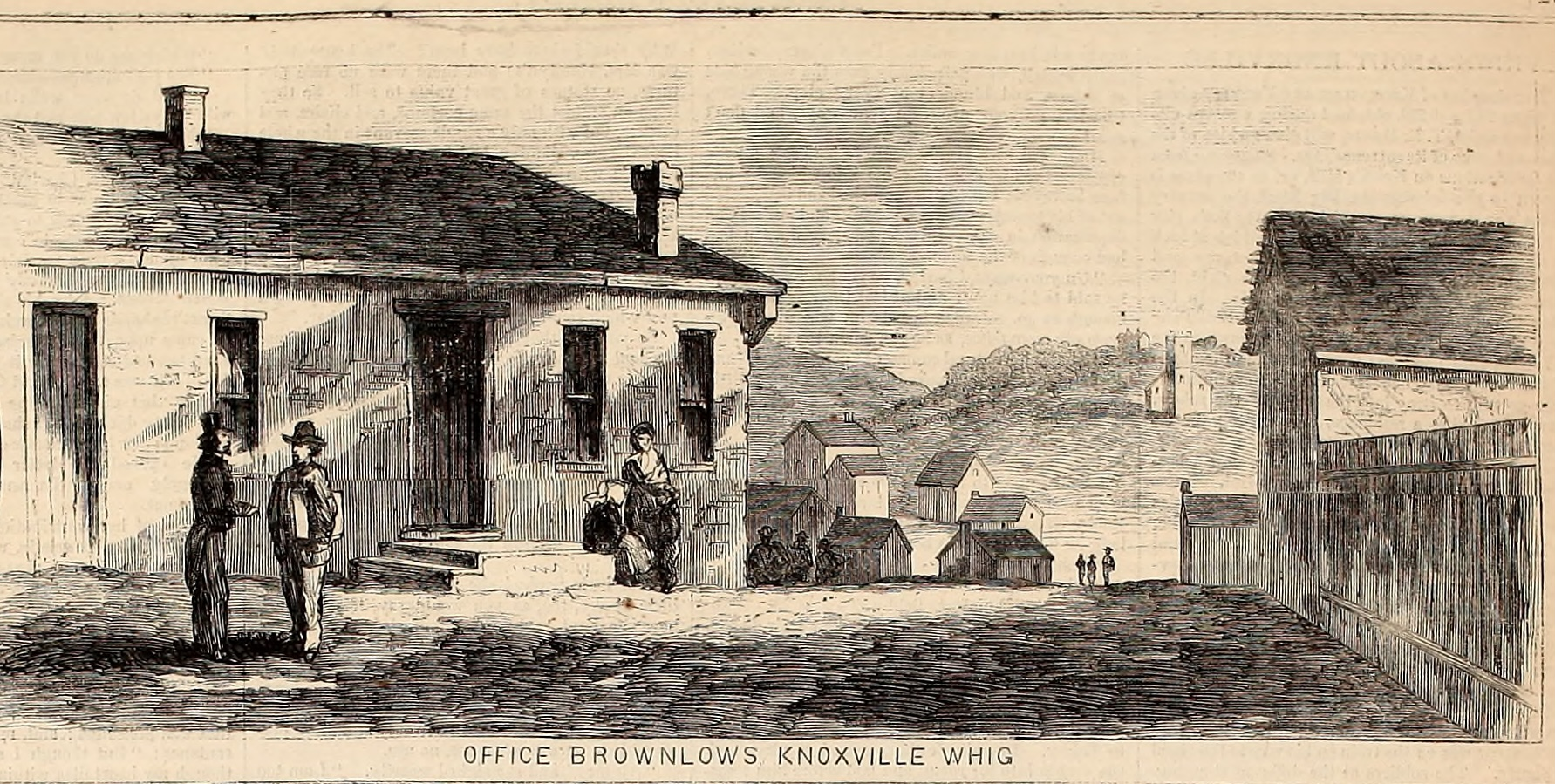
"Office Brownlow's Knoxville Whig" detail from The War in Tennessee by Theodore R. Davis (Harper's Weekly, April 9, 1864)

The Whig was a typical nineteenth-century broadsheet, usually containing four pages, each divided into five (later six) columns. Editorials and news typically occupied the first two-and-a-half pages, and advertisements occupied the last page-and-a-half. The first column often began with a song or poem, after which Brownlow launched into an editorial. Along with political and religious commentary, Brownlow also reported on his travels to various cities, dispensed advice on issues such as marriage and child-rearing, and published his own speeches in their entirety.

The masthead used for the first few issues included the phrase "Liberty, and the Pursuit of Happiness" from the Declaration of Independence, and was soon followed by the motto, "Cry aloud, and spare not," taken from Isaiah 58:1 (KJV). The latter appeared in the paper's nameplate as early as 1839, and was used throughout much of the 1840s. In 1853, Brownlow began using the motto, "Independent in everything, neutral in nothing." For several months after the 1840 elections, the paper used Oliver Hazard Perry's famous line, "We have met the enemy, and they are ours," as its nameplate motto.

=== Titles ===
The Whig was published under the following masthead titles:

- Tennessee Whig (May 16, 1839 in Elizabethton – June 13, 1839)
- The Elizabethton Whig (June 13, 1839 in Elizabethton – nameplate change)
- The Whig (May 6, 1840 – November 3, 1841)
- Jonesborough Whig (November 10, 1841 – May 11, 1842)
- Jonesborough Whig and Independent Journal (May 18, 1842 – April 19, 1849)
- Brownlow's Knoxville Whig and Independent Journal (May 19, 1849 – April 7, 1855)
- Brownlow's Knoxville Whig (April 14, 1855 – July 27, 1861)
- Brownlow's Weekly Whig (August 3, 1861 – October 26, 1861)
- Brownlow's Knoxville Whig, and Rebel Ventilator (November 11, 1863 – February 21, 1866)
- Brownlow's Knoxville Whig (February 28, 1866 – January 27, 1869)
- Knoxville Weekly Whig (February 3, 1869 – March 1870)
- Weekly Whig and Register (c. 1870 – 1871)

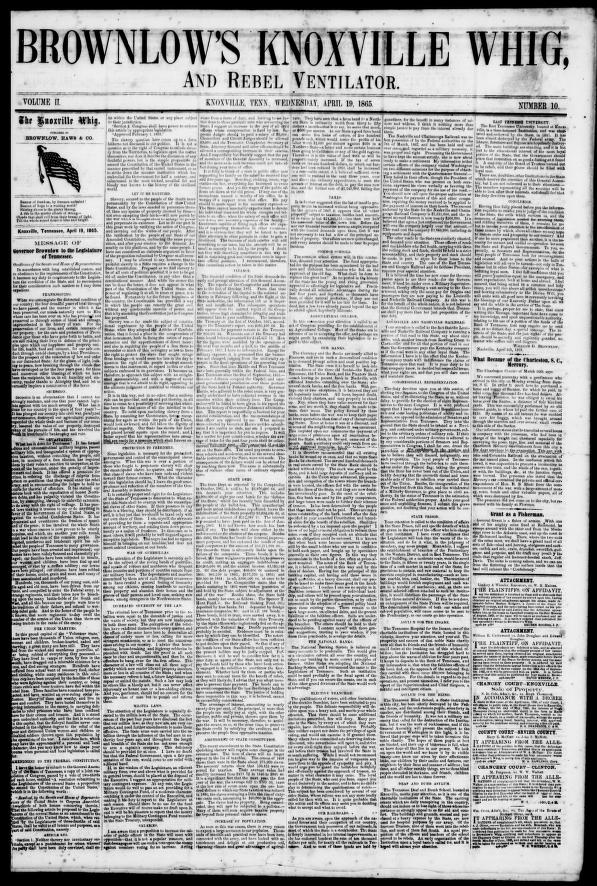
An 1865 edition of the Whig with the subtitle The Rebel Ventilator

== Views ==
=== Politics ===
In an 1842 description of the Whig, Brownlow wrote, "politically, we are WHIG— ultra whig, and of the old school— the 'sworn and eternal foe of locofocoism.'" Brownlow despised President Andrew Jackson, calling him the "greatest curse that ever yet befell this nation." The Whig supported, among other things, a strong central government, federal funding for internal improvements, a weakened presidency, a national bank, and tariffs to protect American products from foreign competition.

As Brownlow's political idol was Kentucky senator Henry Clay, the publisher pleaded with the Whig Party to make Clay its presidential candidate. He became disenchanted when the party snubbed Clay in favor of William Henry Harrison in 1840 and by 1842, Brownlow had turned outright hostile toward Harrison's successor, John Tyler. After Clay's defeat in the presidential election of 1844, Brownlow was grief-stricken. When the party snubbed Clay in favor of Zachary Taylor in 1848, Brownlow called on Whig electors to vote for Clay instead.

In the presidential election of 1852, Brownlow rejected Whig candidate Winfield Scott and supported Daniel Webster, although the Massachusetts senator died before the election. After the Whig Party disintegrated in 1854, Brownlow aligned with the Know Nothing movement, and intensified his attacks on non-Anglo American immigrants. In 1860, after the secession debate had come to dominate politics in the region, the Whig supported Constitutional Union presidential candidate John Bell, helping him capture the state's electoral votes. After the war, the Whig became one of the few papers in the South to support the Radical Republicans.

=== Religion ===
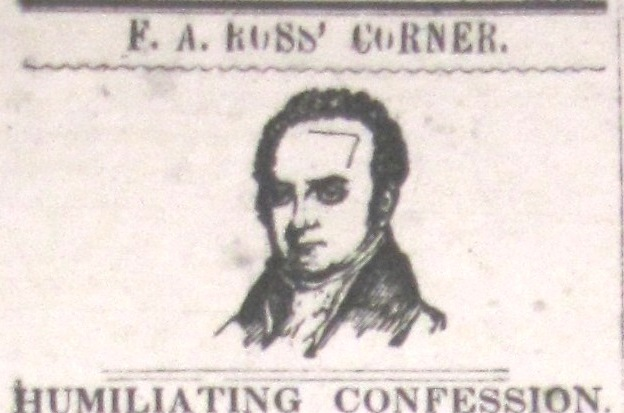
Heading for "F.A. Ross' Corner," a series in the Jonesborough Whig that attacked Presbyterian minister Frederick Augustus Ross

While Clay was Brownlow's political idol, Methodism founder John Wesley was his theological idol. Brownlow consistently refuted Wesley's critics, and two of his favorite targets were Presbyterian minister F. A. Ross and Baptist preacher J. R. Graves. In 1847, the Whig ran a continuous column entitled "Frederick Ross's Corner," which bashed Ross's character.

In the 1840s, as Northern and Southern Methodists argued over the slavery issue, Brownlow was offended by what he perceived as poor treatment of Southern Methodist leaders, especially Bishop Joshua Soule (who had ordained Brownlow as minister). When Northern Methodist leader Thomas Bond called for missionaries to be sent to the South, Brownlow warned that such missionaries would be lynched. "The people of the South," he wrote, "cannot regard such men, whatever may be their claims to the character, as true and faithful ministers of Christianity."

Brownlow's anti-Catholic sentiment was present in the earliest editions of the Whig, and gradually intensified over the years. In 1846, Brownlow ran a multi-part series on "Romanism" in America, claiming that the Catholic Church had kept Europe in "mental slavery" for 1,200 years, and was inherently intolerant and opposed to democracy. Brownlow referred to Catholics as "lousy, sinful, obedient subjects of a foreign Despot," and warned of their encroachment into American government.

=== Secessionism ===
In January 1860, Brownlow asked Whig readers to "pray against the wicked leaders of Abolitionism and the equally ungodly advocates of Secessionism," a statement which sums up his pre-Civil War stance on both issues. Brownlow believed an independent South would continue to be run by the elite - Southern Democratic plantation owners, who would exploit small farmers. "The honest yeomanry of these border States," he wrote, "whose families live by their hard licks, four-fifths of whom own no negroes and never expect to own any, are to be drafted" to fight for the "purse-proud aristocrats of the Cotton States."

While Brownlow had supported Bell in 1860, he praised Lincoln as an "Old Clay Whig," and argued that opposition to him had more to do with sectionalism than with slavery. He blasted the state of South Carolina (the first state to secede) as the "home of traitors," and claimed that most South Carolinians were descended from Revolutionary War Loyalists, and thus had a love of aristocracy that "will never suit Tennesseeans."

=== Slavery ===
Brownlow's views on slavery were complex, and changed over time. In the 1830s, he was opposed to slavery, but for obscure reasons, had changed his mind by the following decade. Historian Robert McKenzie suggests that the hostility of Northern Methodists (who were abolitionists) toward Southern Methodists (who tended to be pro-slavery) in the 1840s may have driven Brownlow into the pro-slavery camp. In any case, by the 1850s, Brownlow was staunchly pro-slavery, arguing that the institution had been "ordained by God."

Brownlow's support for slavery remained unchanged throughout 1860 and 1861, and he and rival editors accused one another of secretly supporting abolitionism. In Parson Brownlow's Book, published in 1862, Brownlow maintains his support of slavery, but clarified that he would do away with it if it meant preserving the Union. By April 1864, however, he had adopted an abolitionist viewpoint, and led a faction calling for emancipation at a gathering of East Tennessee Unionists. After the meeting, he gave a speech in support of a series of resolutions that deemed slavery "incompatible with the perpetuity of free and republican institutions."

== History ==
=== Early publication ===
As a Methodist circuit rider in the 1820s, Brownlow gained a reputation for vicious personal attacks against rival missionaries as they competed for converts across Southern Appalachia, and as early as 1828 Brownlow had been in court facing a slander charge. In the mid-1830s, Brownlow anonymously wrote several articles attacking nullification for the Washington Republican and Farmer's Journal, a Jonesborough-based paper published by retired state supreme court justice Thomas Emmerson (1773–1837). Impressed, Emmerson suggested Brownlow leave the ministry to pursue a career in journalism.

After his marriage in 1839, Brownlow settled in Elizabethton, and began looking for steady income to support his family. T. A. R. Nelson, then a local attorney, suggested Brownlow publish a newspaper to support the Whigs in the upcoming elections. Brownlow formed a partnership with Mason R. Lyon, who had assumed publication of the Republican after Emmerson's death. The first edition of the Tennessee Whig was published on May 16, 1839, with Brownlow as editor and Lyon as publisher. Within a few months, Brownlow's vitriolic editorial style had left Elizabethton bitterly divided.

One Elizabethtonian who developed an immediate dislike of Brownlow was Landon Carter Haynes, a fellow Whig who had switched his support to the Democratic Party in 1839. In May 1840, following the Whig's relocation to Jonesborough, Haynes wrote an article insulting Brownlow's lineage. Enraged, Brownlow accosted Haynes in the streets of Jonesborough, and began beating him with a cane, prompting Haynes to draw a pistol and shoot Brownlow in the thigh. In 1841, Haynes was hired as editor of the Tennessee Sentinel, a Democratic paper published by former Emmerson associate Lawson Gifford, and an intense editorial rivalry developed between Brownlow and Haynes.

=== Jonesborough ===
The feud between Brownlow and Haynes continued through the early 1840s. Brownlow wrote that Haynes abounded in "hopeless rottenness," and accused him of cheating tenants out of corn and selling infected hogs to a North Carolina merchant, while Haynes dubbed Brownlow a "wretched abortion of sin" and a "tarnisher of female innocence." In 1842, Haynes attempted to join the Methodist ministry, but was denied due in part to a series of charges levied against him in the Whig. Haynes finally quit the newspaper business in 1845 to focus on his political career.

In 1843, Brownlow ran for Congress against Andrew Johnson, and used the Whig to promote his own campaign. Brownlow launched a barrage of attacks against Johnson, claiming (correctly) that Johnson's cousin had been hanged for murder, accusing (incorrectly) Johnson's father of being a chicken thief, and suggesting (incorrectly) that Johnson was illegitimate. Even after Johnson won the election, Brownlow continued his attacks. Johnson vowed to ignore him, arguing that Brownlow's "trade is to slander," and that Brownlow was "wholly irresponsible for what he says or does." Brownlow refuted Johnson's dismissal, calling him a "base coward and low-bred scullion" who was simply hiding from the facts.

Brownlow's views and vindictive style provoked numerous assaults and assassination attempts. In March 1840, a gunman fired two shots into Brownlow's house, although both shots missed. In August 1842, a mob attacked Brownlow at a camp meeting, but Brownlow fended them off with a pistol. In April 1849, an unknown assailant clubbed Brownlow in the back of the head, leaving him bedridden for two weeks.

=== Knoxville ===
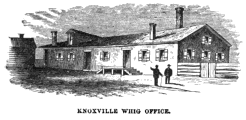
The Whig office in Knoxville

By the time he relocated the Whig to Knoxville in May 1849, Brownlow was already well known in the city. Brownlow had previously clashed with the Democratic Knoxville Standard, which he called a "filthy lying sheet," and blasted its editor, A. R. Crozier, as a "miserable mockery of a man." Before he had settled into his new printing office on Gay Street, Brownlow had become embroiled in a war of words with Knoxville Register editor John Miller McKee that lasted until McKee's departure in 1855.

Andrew Johnson's political ascent in the mid-1850s was a constant source of frustration for Brownlow. The Whig rehashed claims that Johnson's relatives were criminals, and accused Johnson of being an atheist (Johnson never joined a church, but always insisted he was a Christian). After Johnson was reelected governor in 1855, Brownlow published a prayer in the Whig that begged God to forgive Tennessee for electing an "ungodly Governor."

In 1857, the Whig quarrelled with the radical Southern Citizen, published by Knoxville businessman William G. Swan and Irish Patriot John Mitchel, and Brownlow spent at least one night parading in front of Swan's home while brandishing a revolver. During the same period, Brownlow blasted the officers of the failed Bank of East Tennessee, namely William Churchwell, J. G. M. Ramsey, and John H. Crozier, and accused them of swindling money from low-level depositors to pay the bank's wealthy creditors.

=== Secession crisis ===
After the election of Abraham Lincoln in November 1860, the secession debate dominated the pages of the Whig, with Brownlow relentlessly attacking the idea of secession and its supporters. Knoxville's secessionists cited Brownlow as the source of East Tennessee's pro-Union support, complaining that the Whig was "deluding and poisoning the public mind." In hopes of countering this sentiment, the Knoxville Register installed as its editor J. Austin Sperry, a radical secessionist whom Brownlow described as a "scoundrel, debauchee, and coward."

In May 1861, the Whig announced it had exposed a forgery conspiracy involving several secessionists attempting to smear Andrew Johnson (with whom Brownlow had formed an uneasy alliance, since they were both pro-Union). Brownlow pushed this issue for several months, and accused the "corrupt liar, low-down drunkard, irresponsible vagabond, and infamous coward of the Register" of complicity in the matter. In August 1861, Sperry complained about visiting dignitaries spurning him in favor of Brownlow. This provoked taunts from Brownlow, who claimed that a paper with such "limited circulation" as the Register could not be called a "competitor" of the Whig, and cited Sperry's "bad morals" as the reason for dignitaries avoiding him. The Whig reportedly had 10,700 subscribers throughout East Tennessee in 1861.

=== The Civil War ===
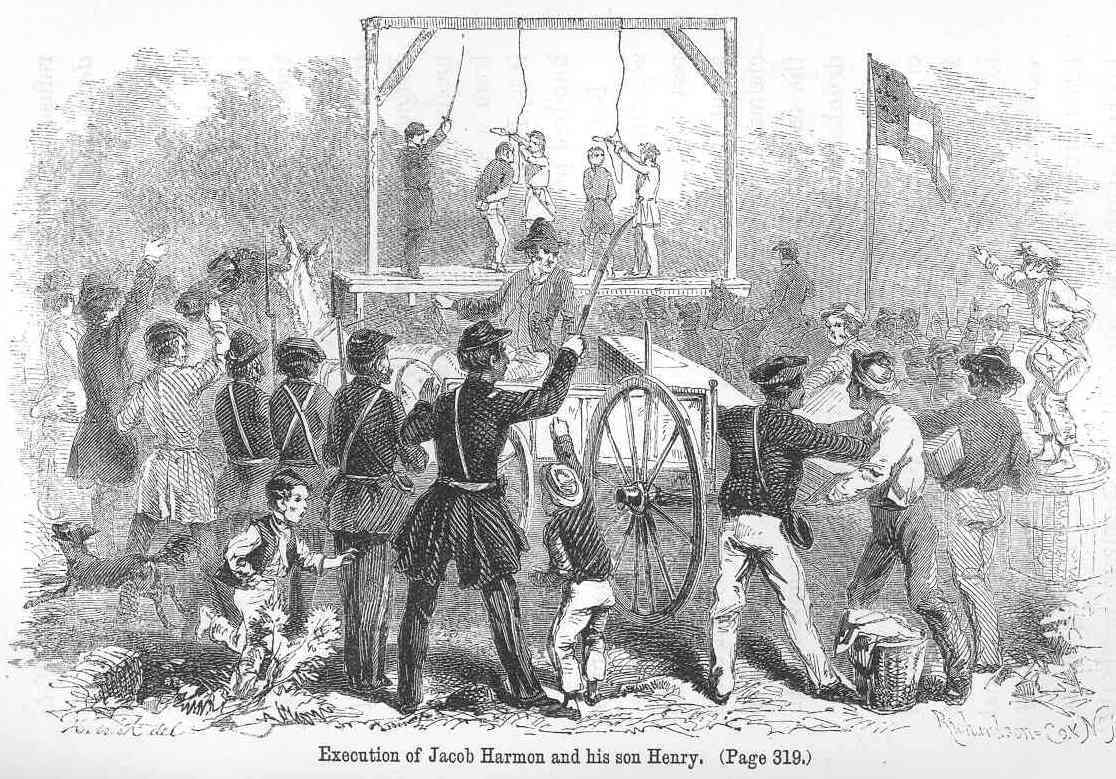
Engraving from Parson Brownlow's Book, showing Confederate soldiers hanging bridge-burning conspirators Jacob and Henry Harmon

After Tennessee withdrew from the Union in June 1861, the Confederate Army occupied East Tennessee and arrested several noted Union supporters. Throughout the summer of that year, Brownlow dedicated much of the Whig to defending these Unionists. By October, the Whig was the last pro-Union newspaper in the Confederacy. Finally, on October 24, Brownlow announced he had become aware of an indictment issued against him and was suspending publication. The Confederate Army confiscated the Whig offices and used the printing machinery to convert muskets into rifles.

Brownlow was eventually arrested but released. He went into exile in the North, where he published a book and played an important role in rallying support for the liberation of East Tennessee. Brownlow painted the region as a Southern Unionist monolith, though the region was more divided than monolithic. He returned to Knoxville on the heels of the Union general Ambrose Burnside's invading army in September 1863, and revived the Whig under the title, Knoxville Whig, and Rebel Ventilator. Brownlow used the Whig to harass Knoxville's Confederates, and had a number of them expelled. These included the Confederate diarist Ellen Renshaw House, who wrote that Brownlow was "the vilest thing that ever lived."

=== Later years ===
After Brownlow was elected Governor of Tennessee in 1865, publication of the Whig was turned over to his son, John Bell Brownlow, although the elder Brownlow continued to write for the paper. As governor, Brownlow used the Whig to issue state proclamations, ignoring a Tennessee law requiring the Secretary of State's signature. In 1868, Brownlow revived his old rivalry with Andrew Johnson by supporting Johnson's impeachment.

In 1869, Brownlow sold the Whig to T. Hawes and Company, which in turn sold it to Knoxville businessman Joseph A. Mabry. Mabry had supported secession during the Civil War, but had since become friends with Brownlow. Mabry tried to transform the Whig into a Democratic newspaper, but was unsuccessful, and the paper failed shortly afterward.

In 1870, William Rule, a former Whig editor, launched the Knoxville Chronicle, which continued the Whig's Republican leanings. Upon his return from the U.S. Senate in 1875, Brownlow purchased half ownership of the Chronicle, and it was renamed the Whig and Chronicle, which he edited until his death in 1877. Rule continued editing the paper, later renamed the Knoxville Journal, until his own death in 1928. The paper's publication continued in Knoxville until 1991.

As of 2013, the Journal is a weekly paper with both print and online editions.
