= Parson Brownlow =

American publisher, minister, and politician (1805–1877)

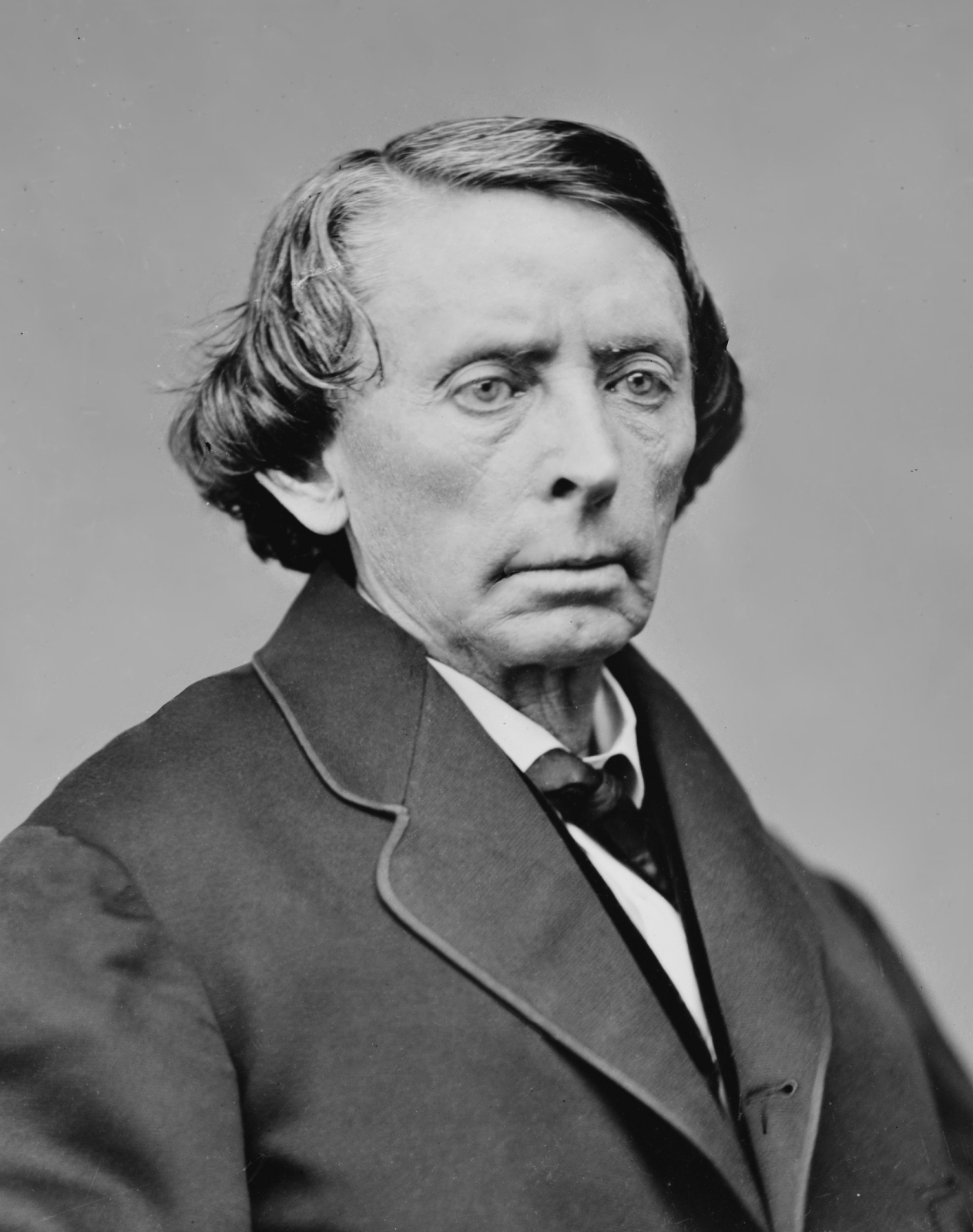

17th Governor of Tennessee
- In office April 5, 1865 – February 25, 1869
- Preceded by: Andrew Johnson as Military Governor
- Succeeded by: Dewitt Clinton Senter

United States Senator from Tennessee
- In office March 4, 1869 – March 3, 1875
- Preceded by: David T. Patterson
- Succeeded by: Andrew Johnson

Personal details
- Born: William Gannaway Brownlow; August 29, 1805 Wythe County, Virginia, U.S.
- Died: April 29, 1877 (aged 71) Knoxville, Tennessee, U.S.
- Resting place: Old Gray Cemetery; Knoxville, Tennessee
- Party: Whig; American; Republican
- Spouse: Eliza O'Brien (m. 1836)
- Relations: Walter P. Brownlow (nephew)
- Children: Susan, John Bell, James, Mary, Fannie, Annie, Caledonia Temple
- Profession: Minister, newspaper editor
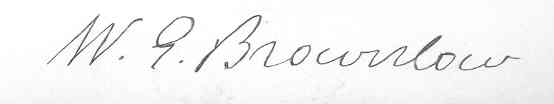
- Signature

William Gannaway "Parson" Brownlow (August 29, 1805 – April 29, 1877) was an American newspaper publisher, Methodist minister, book author, prisoner of war, lecturer, and politician who served as the 17th governor of Tennessee from 1865 to 1869 and as a United States senator from Tennessee from 1869 to 1875. Brownlow rose to prominence in the late 1830s and early 1840s as editor of the Whig, a polemical newspaper in East Tennessee that promoted Henry Clay and the Whig Party ideals, and also that repeated Brownlow's opposition to secession by the southern slave states in the years leading up to the American Civil War. Brownlow's uncompromising and radical viewpoints made him one of the most divisive figures in Tennessee political history and one of the most controversial Reconstruction era politicians of the United States.

Beginning his career as a Methodist circuit rider in the 1820s, Brownlow was both censured and praised by his superiors for his vicious verbal debates responding to rival missionaries of other sectarian Christian beliefs. Later, as a newspaper publisher and editor, he was notorious for his relentless replies in the form of personal attacks against his religious and political opponents, sometimes to the point of being physically assaulted. At the same time, Brownlow was successfully building a large base of fiercely loyal subscribers.

Brownlow returned to Tennessee in 1863 and in 1865 became governor with support of the U.S. Army behind him. Brownlow aligned with the Radical Republicans in the state, supporting President Abraham Lincoln's policies and spent much of his term opposing the policies of conservative Republicans. Brownlow's gubernatorial policies, which were both autocratic and progressive, helped Tennessee become the first former Confederate state to be readmitted to the Union in 1866, exempting it from the lengthy federal military reconstruction inflicted on most of the South. After the Civil War, Brownlow again resumed his opposition to longtime political foe President Andrew Johnson, an often bitter and biting dislike for each other that both Brownlow and Johnson had put aside during the dark days of the Civil War.

Soon after the Civil War, Brownlow and Radical Republicans utilized their control of state government to enfranchise male African-American former slaves with the right to vote and run for public office in Tennessee and extend other civil rights to all former slaves. Conservative Republicans generally opposed these actions by Brownlow and his Radical Republican base, and ex-Confederate political leaders and military officers joined into this opposition directed against Brownlow, utilizing the Ku Klux Klan and likeminded vigilante groups in efforts to disenfranchise African-Americans across Tennessee.

== Early life ==
Brownlow was born in Wythe County, Virginia, in 1805, the eldest son of Joseph A. Brownlow and Catherine Gannaway. His father and mother both died when he was 10. Brownlow and his four siblings were split up among relatives, with Brownlow spending the remainder of his childhood on his uncle John Gannaway's farm. At age 18, Brownlow went to Abingdon where he learned the trade of carpentry from another uncle, George Winniford.

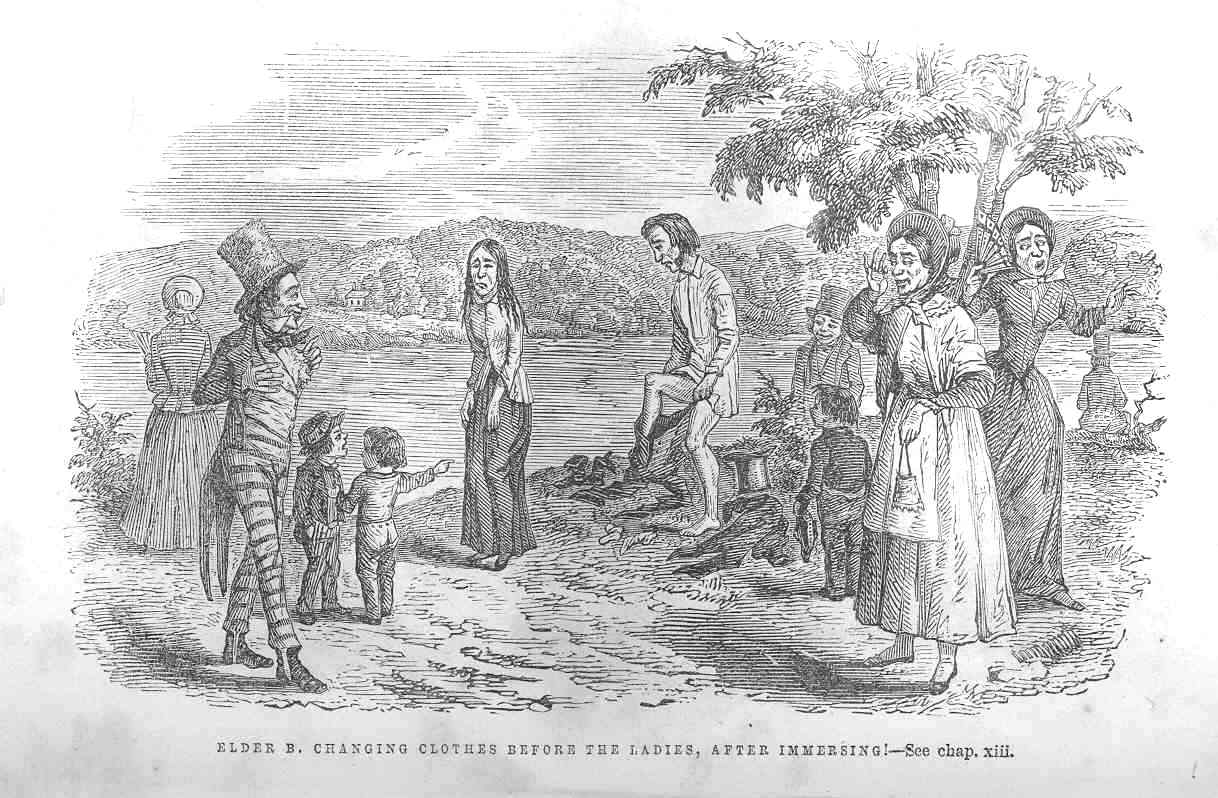
Engraving from Brownlow's book The Great Iron Wheel Examined, showing a Baptist minister changing clothes in front of horrified women after administering a baptism by immersion.

In 1825, Brownlow attended a camp meeting near Sulphur Springs, Virginia, where he experienced a dramatic spiritual rebirth. He later recalled that, suddenly, "all my anxieties were at an end, all my hopes were realized, my happiness was complete." He abandoned the carpentry trade and began studying to become a Methodist minister. In the fall of 1826, he attended the annual meeting of the Holston Conference of the Methodist Church in Abingdon. He applied to join the travelling ministry (commonly called "circuit riders") and was admitted in 1826 by Bishop Joshua Soule.

Soule gave Brownlow his first assignment as a circuit rider: the Black Mountain circuit in North Carolina. It was here that Brownlow first ran afoul of the Baptists—who were spreading quickly throughout the Southern Appalachian region—and developed an immediate dislike of them, considering them narrow-minded bigots who engaged in "dirty" rituals such as foot washing.

The competition in southern Appalachia for both converts and their tithes among the Baptists, Methodists, and Presbyterians was fierce, and diatribes in both speech and print against rival sectarian Christian beliefs and leaders were commonplace among missionaries. In defending his Methodist Church and its early leaders, Brownlow took such debates to a whole new level, attacking Baptist and Presbyterian theology as well as the character of his rival missionaries.

In 1827, Brownlow was assigned as a circuit rider in Maryville, Tennessee, area, where there was a strong Presbyterian presence, and he later recalled being constantly harassed by a young Presbyterian missionary who taunted him with Calvinistic criticisms of Methodism. In 1828, Brownlow was sued for slander, but the suit was dismissed. In 1831, Brownlow was sued for libel by a Baptist preacher and ordered to pay his accuser $5.

In 1832, Brownlow was assigned as a circuit rider to the Pickens District in South Carolina, which he claimed was "overrun with Baptists" and "nullifiers." Unable to make headway in the district, Brownlow circulated his venomous 70-page pamphlet blasting the district's Baptists, and narrowly galloped safely back into the mountains as the district's enraged residents demanded he be hanged. Brownlow's run-in with the South Carolina nullifiers would influence his later views on secession.

Brownlow soon afterward had his 1834 tome Helps To The Study of Presbyterianism (addressing, in part, Brownlow's advancement of the separation of church and state in the United States and the Presbyterian Church domination of the American Sunday School Union) published in Knoxville, Tennessee, by Frederick S. Heiskell.

=== Marriage ===
In 1836 Brownlow married Eliza Ann O'Brien in Carter County, Tennessee, where the two resided in her hometown of Elizabethton. Brownlow began working as a clerk managing her family's O'Brien Furnace (iron foundry), which was located along the banks of the Doe River. Brownlow would often travel by flatboat on both the Watauga River and the Holston River, bringing shipments of iron castings from the O'Brien Furnance to Knoxville.

Although Brownlow left the circuit shortly after his marriage during 1836, he continued his staunch defense of Methodism and Methodist leaders against the published attacks by religious leaders and writers of other Christian beliefs within his newspaper columns, books, and speeches. For the remainder of his life, Brownlow was known to friend and foe alike as the "Fighting Parson".

== Newspaper editor ==
In 1838 Brownlow wrote for the short-lived Elizabethton Republican and Manufacturer's Advocate, initially under its editor William Gott. This weekly Elizabethton newspaper advanced Whig politics, and by the time that Brownlow was promoted as editor, the paper had some 300 subscribers.

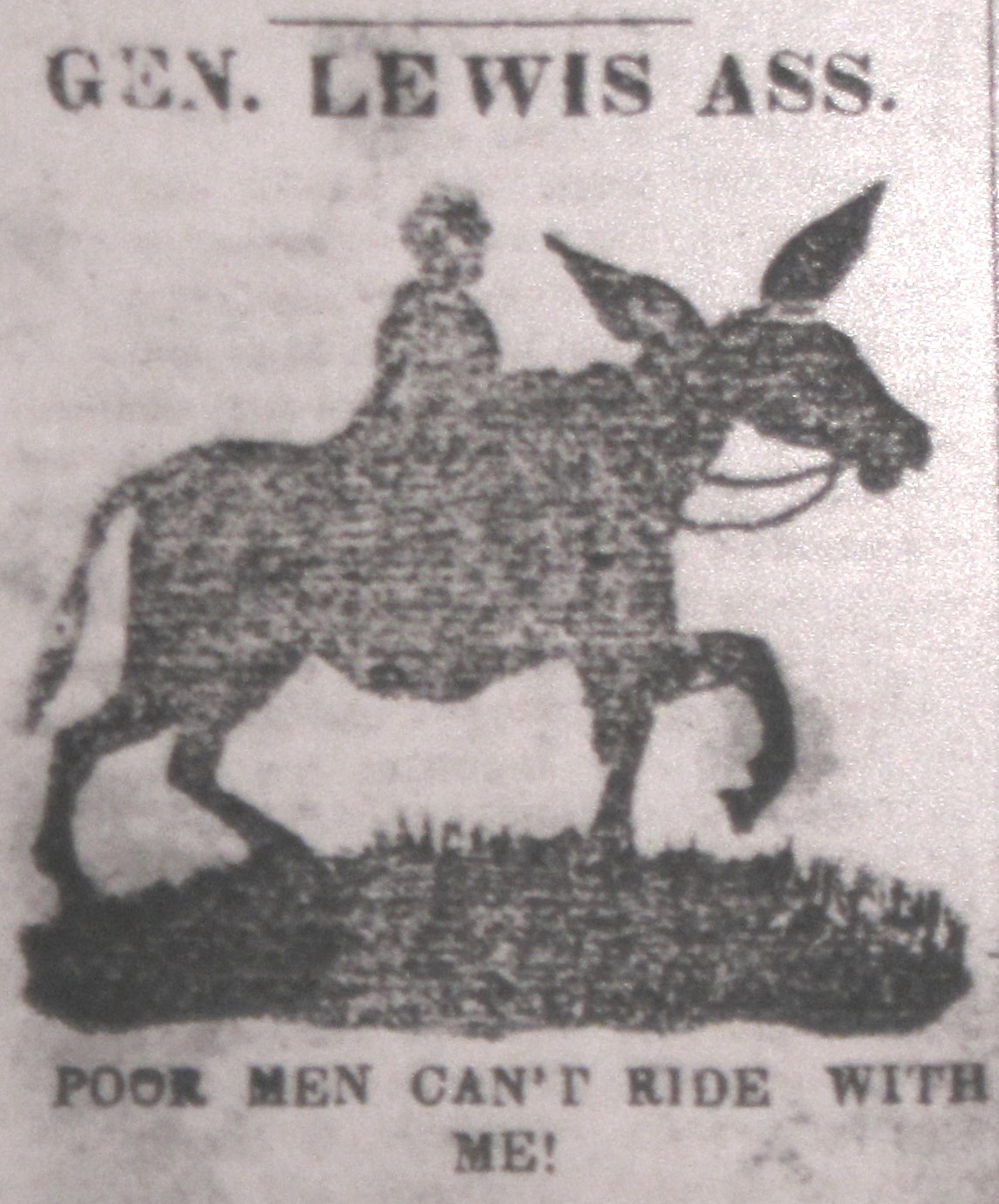
Ad in an 1848 issue of the Jonesborough Whig, attacking presidential candidate Lewis Cass

Historian Stephen Ash says:

What made the Parson stand out was, more than anything else, his vitriolic tongue and pen. Over the course of his long career, he took up many causes. These included not only Methodism, Whiggery, and the Union, but also temperance, Know-Nothingism, and slavery. His favorite method of promoting those causes was to chastise and ridicule his opponents, and few men could do so with as much venomous wit as he. Baptists, Presbyterians, Catholics, Mormons, Democrats, Republicans, secessionists, drunks, immigrants, and abolitionists—all were at one time or another on the receiving end of Brownlow's merciless broadsides. Not surprisingly, he made many enemies. A number of them replied in kind; some tried to kill him.

Elizabethton attorney Thomas A. R. Nelson suggested that Brownlow should launch a newspaper to support Whig Party candidates in the upcoming elections. Brownlow partnered with Elizabethton newspaper publisher Mason R. Lyon, and as the editor within their partnership, with the agreement that Brownlow would receive one-third of the new profits from the Tennessee Whig. Brownlow and Lyon launched their weekly on May 16, 1839, and within several weeks, Brownlow and Lyon rebranded the paper as the Elizabethton Whig.

As Brownlow's vituperative editorial style quickly brought bitter division to Elizabethton, and he began quarreling with local Whig-turned-Democrat Landon Carter Haynes. Haynes had read law under Nelson, and Haynes later followed Nelson to Jonesborough, Tennessee, during 1840, where Haynes would eventually edit a Jonesborough newspaper. Brownlow and the Elizabethton Whig also relocated from Elizabethton to Jonesborough during the same year, where the newspaper was again rebranded as the Jonesboro Whig. Brownlow accosted Haynes in the street and proceeded to beat Haynes with a sword cane, prompting Haynes to draw out his pistol and shoot Brownlow in the thigh. In 1841 Haynes became editor of the competing Democratic Tennessee Sentinel, and Brownlow and Haynes continued to publish polemics targeting each other within their respective newspapers over the next several years.

In 1845, Brownlow ran against Andrew Johnson for the state's 1st District seat in the U.S. House of Representatives. Using the Whig to support his campaign, he accused Johnson of being illegitimate, suggested Johnson's relatives were murderers and thieves, and stated that Johnson was an atheist. Johnson won the election by 1,300 votes, out of just over 10,000 votes cast.

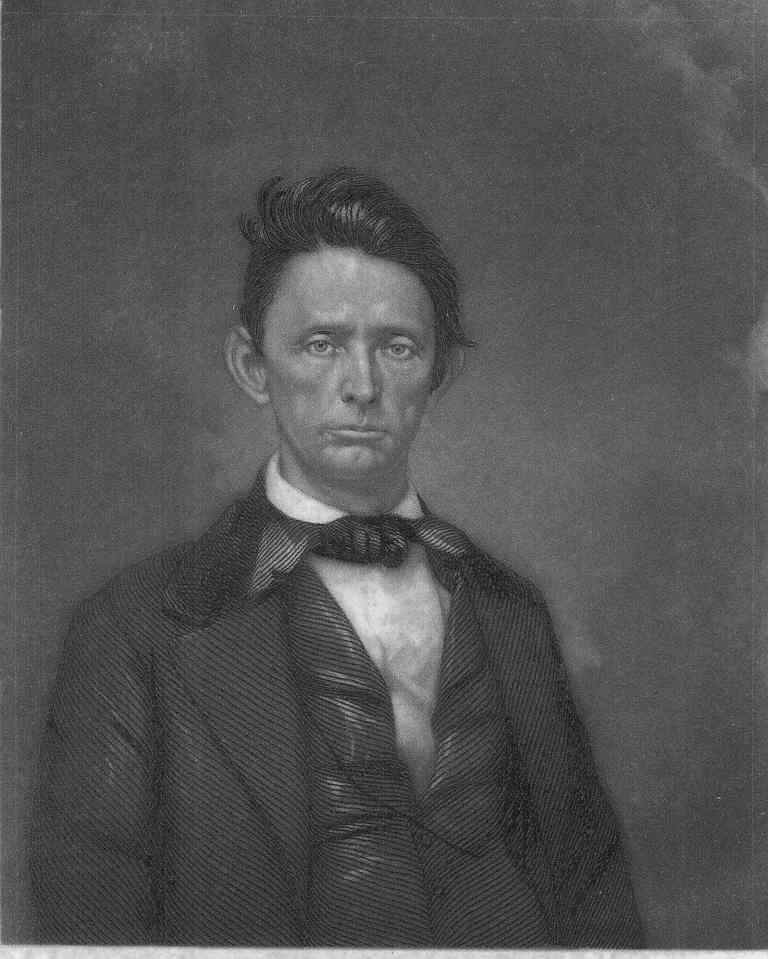
Brownlow as he appeared on the frontispiece of his 1856 book, The Great Iron Wheel Examined

Brownlow supported Whig policies such as a national bank, federal funding for internal improvements (more specifically, public improvements to the Moccasin Bend area of the Tennessee River near Chattanooga allowing for better steamboat transportation of goods to New Orleans), developing industries within northeast Tennessee, and a weakened presidency. In his 1844 book, A Political Register, he calls Andrew Jackson the "greatest curse that ever yet befell this nation," and attacks Jackson's supporters, the Locofocos. Brownlow supported Whig candidates such as John Bell, James C. Jones, and Kentucky Senator Henry Clay. Clay was consistently Brownlow's first choice for the party's presidential candidate throughout the 1840s. Brownlow's son John recalled that one of the few times he ever saw his father cry was after he had received the news of Clay's defeat in the 1844 presidential election.

In May 1849, Brownlow relocated the Whig to Knoxville, where he was already well known for his clashes with the Democratic Standard, which he had dubbed a "filthy lying sheet." Prior to the departure of Brownlow and his newspaper from Jonesborough, an unknown assailant clubbed Brownlow in the head, leaving him bedridden for two weeks. He blamed this act on Knoxville's newspaper interests, who feared his competition. Upon his arrival, he became embroiled in an editorial war with Knoxville Register editor John Miller McKee that lasted until McKee's departure in 1855.

Brownlow joined the Sons of Temperance in 1850 and promoted temperance policies in the Whig (one of his more common personal attacks was to accuse his opponents of being "drunkards"). Following the collapse of the Whig Party in the mid-1850s, he aligned himself with the Know Nothing movement, as he had long shared this movement's anti-Catholic and nativist sentiments. In 1856, he published a book, Americanism Contrasted with Foreignism, Romanism and Bogus Democracy, which attacked foreigners, Catholicism and Democratic politicians.

In the late 1850s, Brownlow turned his attention to Knoxville's Democratic Party leaders and their associates. He quarreled with the radical Southern Citizen, a pro-secession newspaper published by businessman William G. Swan and Irish patriot John Mitchel (who spent time in Knoxville while in exile), and on at least one occasion, threatened Swan with a revolver. Following the failure of the Bank of East Tennessee in 1858, Brownlow ruthlessly assailed its directors. His attacks forced A.R. Crozier and William M. Churchwell to flee the state and drove John H. Crozier from public life. Brownlow sued another director, J. G. M. Ramsey, winning a civil judgement on behalf of the bank's depositors.

Partially a result of Brownlow's persistent opposition to secession within the pages of his newspapers (and partially due to his long-time feud with Ramsey, who was a Confederate sympathizer), he was later jailed by Confederate States military authorities (the CSA district attorney in Knoxville was related to Ramsey) in December 1861, pardoned, and subsequently forced into exile in the northern United States.

== Sectarian debates ==
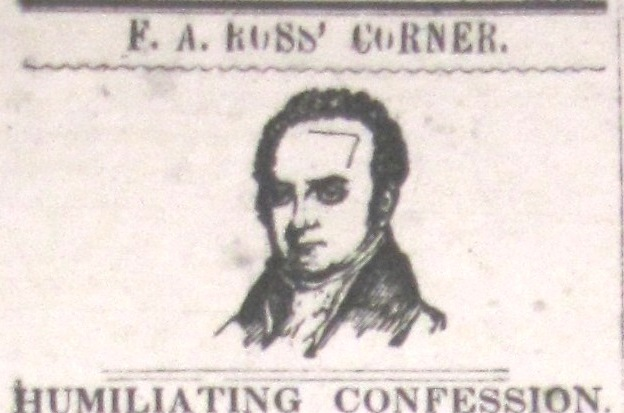
Heading for "F.A. Ross' Corner," a series in Brownlow's Jonesborough Whig that attacked Presbyterian minister Frederick Augustus Ross.

While Brownlow left the preaching circuit in the 1830s, he continued responding to the critics attacking the Methodist faith. In 1843, his feud with Haynes led to Haynes being barred from the Methodist clergy. That same year, J.M. Smith, editor of the Abingdon Virginian, accused Brownlow of having stolen jewelry at a camp meeting. Brownlow denied the charge and accused Smith of being an adulterer. At the Methodists' Holston Conference that year, Smith tried unsuccessfully to have Brownlow expelled from the church.

In the late 1840s, Brownlow quarreled with Presbyterian minister Frederick Augustus Ross. Ross had "declared war" on Methodism as a co-editor in his Calvinist Magazine, published from 1827 to 1832. Although distracted by internecine conflict within the Presbyterian Church for nearly a decade, he relaunched the Calvinist Magazine in 1845. Ross argued that the Methodist Church was despotic, comparing it to a "great iron wheel" that would crush American liberty. He stated that most Methodists were descended from Revolutionary War Loyalists and accused the Methodist Church founder John Wesley of believing in ghosts and witches.

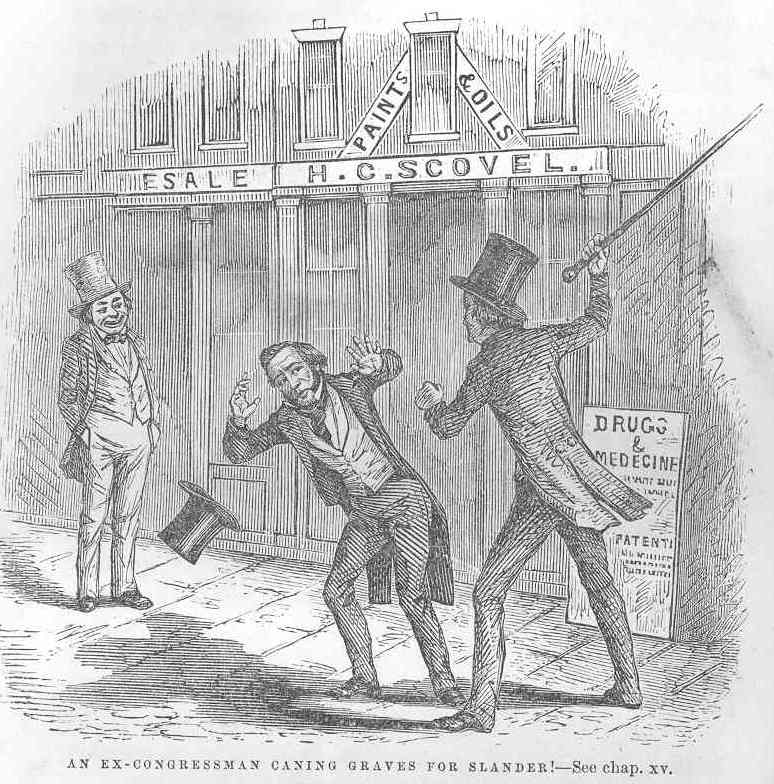
Engraving from Brownlow's The Great Iron Wheel Examined, showing an ex-Congressman attacking James Robinson Graves for slander.

Brownlow initially responded to Ross with a running column, "F.A. Ross' Corner," in the Jonesborough Whig. In 1847, he launched a separate paper, the Jonesborough Quarterly Review, which was dedicated to refuting Ross's attacks, and embarked on a speaking tour that summer. Brownlow argued that while it was common in Wesley's time for people to believe in ghosts, he provided evidence that many Presbyterian ministers still believed in such things. He derided Ross as a "habitual adulterer" and the son of a slave, and accused his relatives of stealing and committing indecent acts (Ross's son responded to the latter charge with a death threat). This quarrel continued until Brownlow moved to Knoxville in 1849.

In 1856, James Robinson Graves, the Landmark Baptist minister of Nashville's Second Baptist Church, ripped Methodists in his book, The Great Iron Wheel, which used terminology and attacks similar to the ones Ross had used in the previous decade. Brownlow fired back with The Great Iron Wheel Examined; Or, Its False Spokes Extracted, published that same year. In it he accuses Graves of slandering an ex-congressman, argues that Baptist ministers are mostly illiterate and opposed to learning, and charges that the Baptist religion is wrought with "selfishness, bigotry, intolerance, and shameful want of Christian liberality." Brownlow also mocked the Baptist's use of immersion baptism.

== Slavery and secession ==
Brownlow's views on slavery changed over time. While his pre-Civil War writings reveal a strong pro-slavery slant, his name appears on an 1834 abolitionist petition. In the early 1840s, Brownlow supported the American Colonization Society, which sought to recolonize freed slaves in Liberia. In subsequent years, however, he shifted to a staunchly pro-slavery stance. Indeed he owned slaves himself. Brownlow's friend and colleague, Oliver Perry Temple, stated that social pressure in the 1830s pushed most abolitionist Southerners to adopt pro-slavery views. Historian Robert McKenzie, however, suggests that Brownlow's pro-slavery shift might have been rooted in the rivalry between Northern and Southern Methodists over the issue in the 1840s.

By the 1850s, Brownlow was radically pro-slavery, arguing that the institution was "ordained by God." He gave a Scriptural defense of slavery in a speech delivered in Knoxville in 1857, and in 1858 he issued a challenge to Northern abolitionists to debate the issue. The challenge was initially accepted by Frederick Douglass, but Brownlow refused to debate him because of his race. The challenge was then taken up by Abram Pryne of McGrawville, New York, a clergyman with the Congregational Church and editor of an abolitionist newspaper. At the debate, which took place in Philadelphia in September 1858, Brownlow states in his opening argument:

Not only will I throughout this discussion openly and boldly take the ground that Slavery as it exists in America ought to be perpetuated, but that slavery is an established and inevitable condition to human society. I will maintain the ground that God always intended the relation of master and slave to exist; that Christ and the early teachers of Christianity, found slavery differing in no material respect from American slavery, incorporated into every department of society ... that slavery having existed ever since the first organization of society, it will exist to the end of time.

During the course of the Civil War, Brownlow returned to an anti-slavery stance, calling for emancipation.

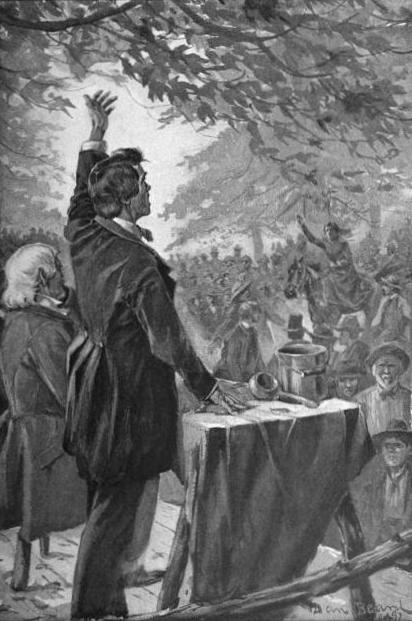
Illustration in Barton's A Hero In Homespun, showing Brownlow delivering a pro-Union speech in Sevierville in 1861

Brownlow was staunchly opposed to Southern secession. He argued that secessionists wanted to form a country governed by "purse-proud aristocrats" of the Southern planter class. Brownlow endorsed pro-Union candidate John Bell for president in 1860, and in September he interrupted a pro-John C. Breckinridge rally in Knoxville to spar with the rally's keynote speaker, William L. Yancey of Alabama. When South Carolina seceded following Lincoln's election in November 1860, Brownlow derided the state and its "miserable cabbage-leaf of a Palmetto flag" as being descended from British Loyalists, thus giving it an affinity for the aristocratic types that would govern the proposed Southern Confederacy.

By 1861, the Knoxville Whig had 14,000 subscribers, and was considered by secessionists the root of the stubborn pro-Union sentiment in East Tennessee (the region had resoundingly rejected a referendum on secession in February 1861). Knoxville's Democrats tried to counter Brownlow by installing radical secessionist J. Austin Sperry as editor of the Knoxville Register, touching off an editorial war that lasted throughout much of the year. Brownlow called Sperry a "scoundrel" and a "debauchee," and mocked the relatively small circulation of the Register.

Throughout the spring of 1861, Brownlow and his colleagues, Oliver Perry Temple, T.A.R. Nelson, and Horace Maynard, canvassed East Tennessee, giving dozens of pro-Union speeches. Brownlow represented Knox County at the East Tennessee Convention which unsuccessfully petitioned the state legislature to allow East Tennessee to form a separate, Union-aligned state. In the weeks following Tennessee's secession in June 1861, Brownlow used the Whig to defend Unionists accused of treasonous acts by Confederate authorities. By the fall of 1861, the Whig was the last pro-Union newspaper in the South. He was quoted as saying "We intend to fight the secessionists until hell freezes over, and then fight them on ice."

== American Civil War ==
On October 24, 1861, Brownlow suspended publication of the Whig after announcing Confederate authorities were preparing to arrest him. On November 4, he left Knoxville and went into hiding in the Great Smoky Mountains to the south, where there was a strong pro-Union presence, and spent several weeks staying with friends in Wears Valley and Tuckaleechee Cove. On November 8, pro-Union guerillas burned several railroad bridges in East Tennessee and attacked several others. Confederate leaders immediately suspected Brownlow of complicity, but he denied any involvement in the attacks.

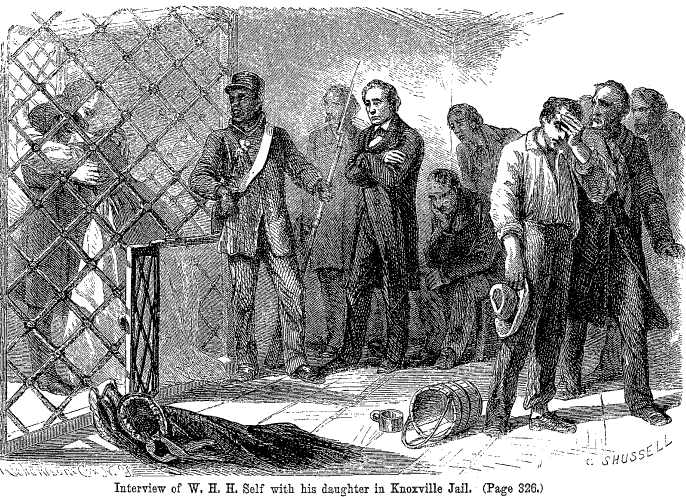
Brownlow (center) watches as condemned bridge-burner Harrison Self bids goodbye to his daughter; Self was eventually pardoned by Jefferson Davis

Brownlow asked for permission to leave the state, which was granted by Confederate Secretary of War Judah P. Benjamin. On December 6, as he was in Knoxville preparing to leave, however, Knox County Commissioner Robert B. Reynolds and Confederate States District Attorney John Crozier Ramsey (a son of Confederate States treasury agent J. G. M. Ramsey, who Brownlow earlier in that year referred to as "the vain old historian of Tennessee") arrested and jailed Brownlow on charges of treason. While jailed, Brownlow witnessed the trials and last moments of many of the condemned bridge-burners, which he recorded in a diary. He sent a letter to Benjamin protesting his incarceration, writing, "which is your highest authority, the Secretary of War, a Major General, or a dirty little drunken attorney such as J.C. Ramsey is!" After Benjamin threatened to pardon Brownlow, he was released in late December 1861.

Brownlow was escorted to Nashville (which the Union Army had captured) and crossed over into Union-controlled territory on March 3, 1862. His struggle against secession had made him a celebrity in northern states, and he embarked upon a speaking tour, starting with speeches in Cincinnati and Dayton in early April. He spoke alongside Indiana Governor Oliver P. Morton at Metropolitan Hall in Indianapolis on April 8, and he spoke at the Merchants' Exchange in Chicago a few days later. On April 14, he addressed the Ohio state legislature in Columbus. He hosted a banquet at the Monongahela House in Pittsburgh on April 17, and spoke at Independence Hall in Philadelphia two days later.

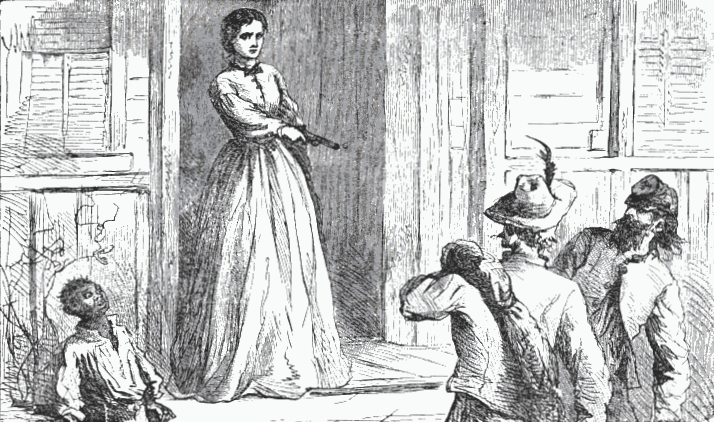
An artist's 1888 illustration of Brownlow's daughter, Susan, threatening Confederate soldiers who sought to remove the American flag from the Brownlows' home in Knoxville

In Philadelphia, publisher George W. Childs convinced Brownlow to write a book, Sketches of the Rise, Progress, and Decline of Secession, which was completed in May 1862. By September, the book had sold over 100,000 copies. Brownlow then headed to the northeast, where he addressed the New York City Chamber of Commerce on May 14, and spoke at the Academy of Music on May 15. In subsequent weeks, he spoke in Boston and various cities in New England, and later toured western New York and Illinois. In late June, he testified at the impeachment trial of West Hughes Humphreys, a Confederate judge who had denied Brownlow bail following his arrest in December.

In June 1862, workers at the Colt Armory in Hartford presented a revolver to Brownlow's daughter Susan, who had threatened to shoot two Confederate soldiers attempting to remove the American flag from the Brownlows' home in Knoxville in December 1861. Later that year, Erastus Beadle published a dime novel, Parson Brownlow and the Unionists of East Tennessee. In 1863, Philadelphia-based music publisher Lee and Walker issued a musical score, Parson Brownlow's Quick Step.Brownlow's sons, John B. Brownlow and James P. Brownlow, both saw combat as Union cavalry officers

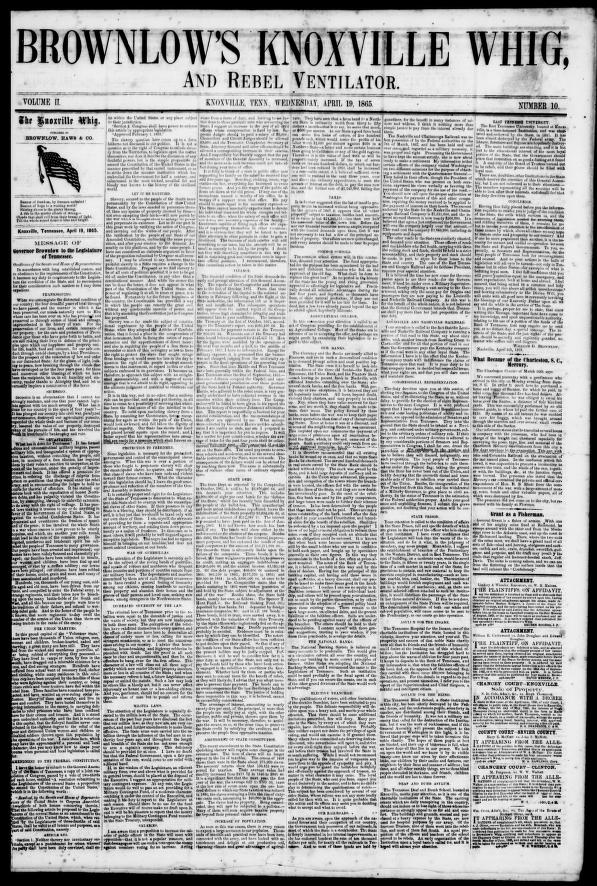
Brownlow's characteristic forthright communication style is evident in the newspaper title Rebel Ventilator.

Brownlow returned to Nashville in early 1863 and followed Ambrose Burnsides's forces back to Knoxville in September. In November 1863, using proceeds from his speaking tour, he relaunched the Whig under the title Knoxville Whig and Rebel Ventilator and began vengefully pursuing ex-Confederates. He spent a portion of 1864 attempting to reorganize his church's Holston Conference and realign it with the northern Methodists.

== Governor of Tennessee ==
Brownlow was nominated for governor by a convention of Tennessee Unionists in January 1865. He was the only nominee. This convention also submitted state constitutional amendments outlawing slavery and declaring the Ordinance of Secession null and void. The military Governor Andrew Johnson had enacted a series of measures that essentially prevented ex-Confederates from voting, and on March 4 Brownlow was elected by a 23,352 to 35 vote, and the amendments passed by a similarly lopsided margin. The vote met President Lincoln's "1/10th test," which recognized elections in Southern states if the total vote was at least one-tenth the total vote in the 1860 presidential election.

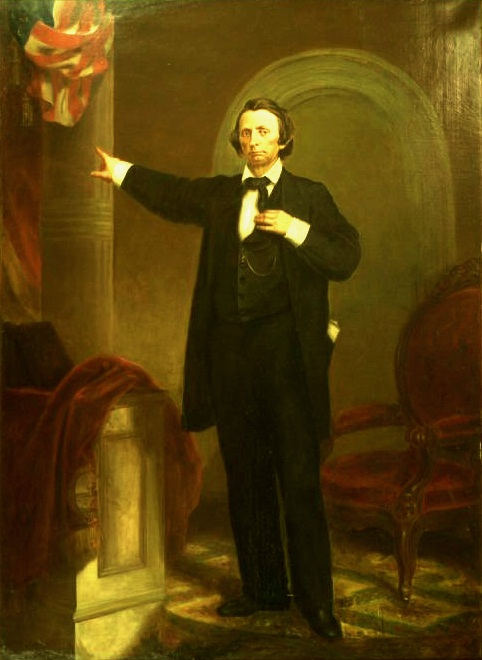
Portrait of Governor Brownlow by George Dury. This official portrait of Governor Brownlow was briefly displayed within the Tennessee State Capitol building during 1987.

In early April 1865, Brownlow arrived in Nashville, a city which he despised, having called it a "dunghill" and stating it had a "deadly, treasonable exhalation." He was sworn in on April 5 and submitted the 13th Amendment for ratification the following day. After this amendment was ratified, Brownlow submitted a series of bills to punish former Confederates. He disfranchised for at least five years anyone who had supported the Confederacy, and, in cases of Confederate leaders, 15 years. He later strengthened this law to require prospective voters to prove they had supported the Union. He tried to impose fines for wearing a Confederate uniform and attempted to bar Confederate ministers from performing marriages.

After a few months in office Brownlow decided Johnson, who had by then become President of the United States, was too lenient toward former Confederate leaders, and he aligned himself with the Radical Republicans, a group which dominated Congress and vehemently opposed Johnson. In the elections for the state's congressional seats held in August 1865, Brownlow rejected nearly one-third of the total vote to allow Radical candidate Samuel Arnell to win in the 6th District. A small group of state legislators, led by state Speaker of the House William Heiskell, turned against Brownlow, alleging his actions were too despotic, and they aligned with Johnson. By 1866, Brownlow had come to believe that some Southerners were plotting another rebellion and that Johnson would be its leader.

=== Opposition to the Ku Klux Klan ===
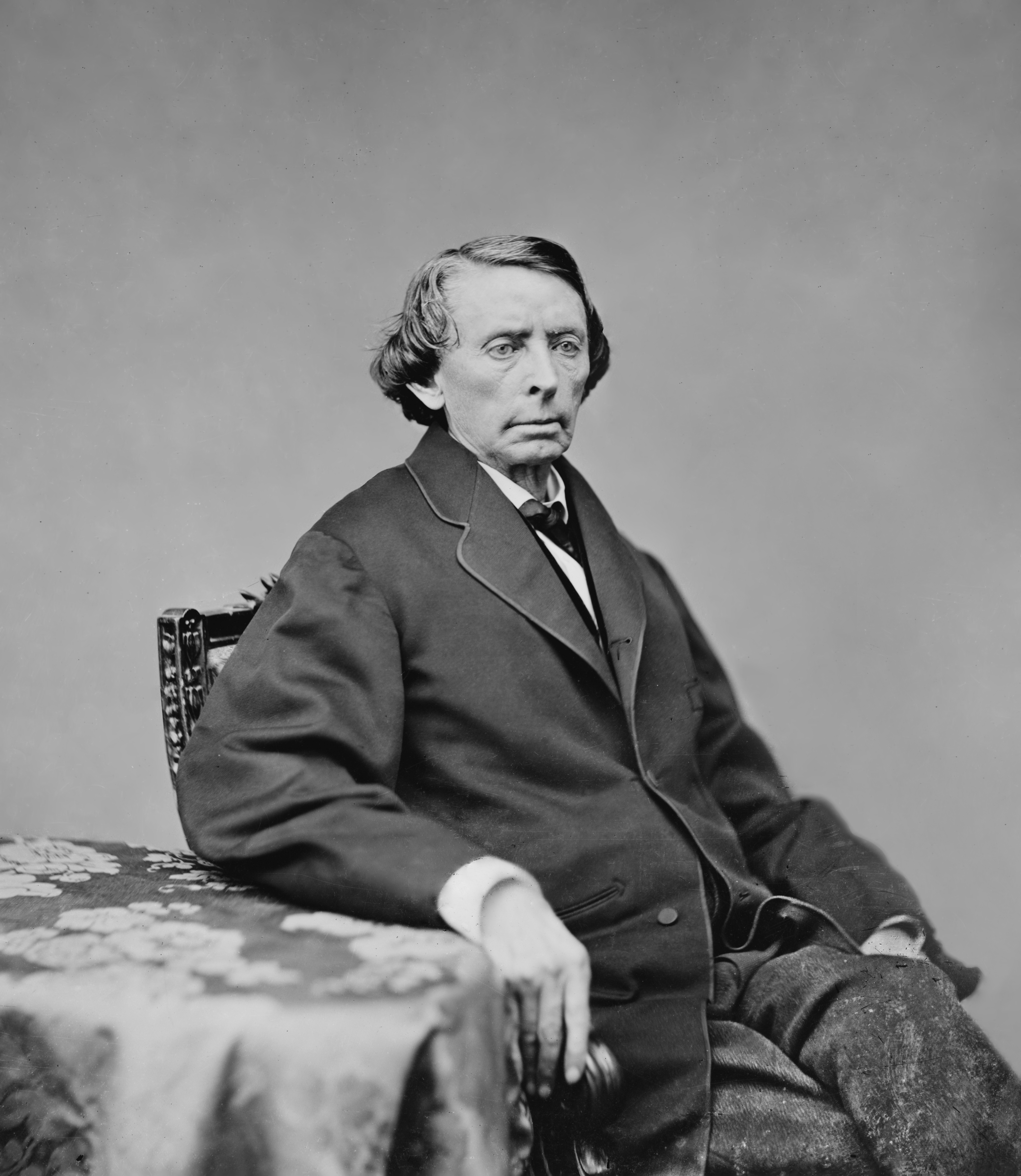
Photograph of Brownlow by Mathew Brady

Brownlow began calling for civil rights to be extended to freed slaves, stating that "a loyal Negro was more deserving than a disloyal white man." In May 1866, he submitted the 14th Amendment for ratification, which the Radicals in Congress supported but Johnson and his allies opposed. The pro-Johnson minority in the statehouse attempted to flee Nashville to prevent a quorum, and the House sergeant-at-arms was dispatched to arrest them. Two were captured—Pleasant Williams and A. J. Martin—and confined to the House committee room, giving the House the necessary number of members present to establish a quorum. After the amendment passed by a 43-11 vote, Heiskell refused to sign it and resigned in protest. His successor signed it, however, and the amendment was ratified. In transmitting the news to Congress, Brownlow taunted Johnson, stating, "My compliments to the dead dog in the White House." Tennessee was readmitted to the Union shortly afterward and was represented in Congress again by 1866; Tennessee was the only former Confederate state that bypassed military Reconstruction, but federal troops would remain in the state to protect federal property, help enforce laws, and keep the peace.

The Radicals nominated Brownlow for a second term for governor in February 1867. His opponent was Emerson Etheridge, a frequent critic of the Brownlow administration. The legislature passed a bill giving the state's black residents the right to vote, and Union Leagues were organized to help freed slaves in this process. Members of these leagues frequently clashed with disfranchised ex-Confederates, including members of the burgeoning Ku Klux Klan, and Brownlow organized a state guard, led by General Joseph Alexander Cooper, to protect voters (and harass the opposition). With the state's ex-Confederates disfranchised, Brownlow easily defeated Etheridge in the 1867 election.

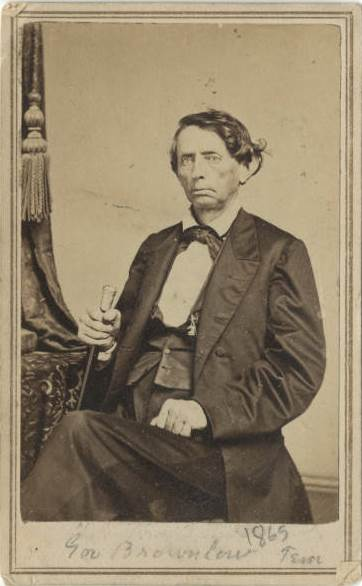
Photograph of Brownlow by Carl Giers

By 1868, Klan violence had increased significantly. The organization had sent Brownlow a death threat and had come close to assassinating Congressman Arnell. General Nathan Bedford Forrest joined the Klan, becoming its first grand wizard, partially in response to the disfranchisement policies of Brownlow. The William G. Brownlow Family Papers, 1836-1900, archived by the Tennessee Secretary of State, contains one letter dated July 4, 1868, from the Great-Grand Cyclops of the Ku Klux Klan Stella Morton, in which Morton threatens Governor Brownlow's life.

In an interview with the Cincinnati Commercial, Forrest stated, "I have never recognized the present government in Tennessee as having any legal existence." He objected to Brownlow calling out the militia and warned if they "committed outrages...they and Mr. Brownloe's [sic] government will be swept out of existence not a Radical will be left alive." Forrest claimed the Klan had more than 40,000 members in Tennessee and 550,000 in the southern states. He said the Klan supported the Democratic Party. Forrest suggested that a proclamation of Brownlow called for shooting members of the Klan. Forrest denied being a member of the Klan himself.

Forrest and twelve other Klan members submitted a petition to Brownlow, stating they would cease their activities if Confederates were given the right to vote. Brownlow rejected this, however, and set about reorganizing the state guard and pressing the legislature for still greater enforcement powers.

Brownlow endorsed Ulysses S. Grant for president in 1868 and asked for federal troops to be stationed in 21 Tennessee counties to counter rising Klan activity. The state legislature granted him the power to throw out entire counties' voter registrations if he thought they included disfranchised voters. In October 1868, prior to the election, Brownlow discarded all registered voters in Lincoln County. Following the election, two of the Radicals' congressional candidates, Lewis Tillman in the 4th District and William J. Smith in the 8th District, were initially defeated. Brownlow, believing Klan intimidation to be the reason for their defeat, rejected the votes from Marshall and Coffee counties, allowing Tillman to win, and rejected the votes from Fayette and Tipton counties, allowing Smith to win.

In February 1869, as Brownlow's final term was near its end, he placed nine counties under martial law, arguing this was necessary to quell rising Klan violence. He also dispatched five state guard companies to occupy Pulaski, where the Klan had been founded. After Brownlow left office in March, Forrest ordered the Klan to destroy its costumes and cease all activities.

== U.S. Senate and later life ==
Brownlow decided he would not seek a third gubernatorial term and instead sought election to the U.S. Senate seat that would be vacated by David T. Patterson, Andrew Johnson's son-in-law, in 1869. In October 1867, the state legislature elected Brownlow over William B. Stokes by a 63 to 39 vote. By the time he was sworn in on March 4, 1869, a persistent nervous disease had weakened him considerably, and the Senate clerk had to read his speeches. One of his speeches was a defense of Ambrose Burnside, the Union general who had liberated Knoxville from Confederate forces in 1863.

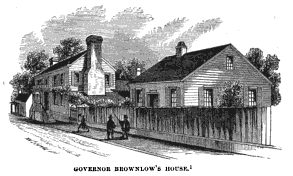
Brownlow's house and library at 211 Cumberland Avenue in Knoxville (no longer extant), as drawn by Benson John Lossing

Brownlow was a member of the U.S. Senate when the final version of the bill S. 810 was introduced onto the Senate floor on April 19, 1870, enacted the next month by the U.S. Congress, and signed into law by President Grant on May 31, 1870 as the Enforcement Act of 1870 (also known under the popular titles as the Civil Rights Act of 1870 or the First Ku Klux Klan Act) and the later Second Enforcement Act of 1871 (also known under the popular titles as the Civil Rights Act of 1871 or the Third Ku Klux Klan Act) of the United States Congress which empowered the president to suspend the writ of habeas corpus in order to combat the Ku Klux Klan and other white supremacy organizations.

Interviewed (while suffering visibly from the "palsy" that afflicted him in later life) in 1871 by a reporter from the New York Herald, Brownlow essentially predicted the failure of Reconstruction, the coming nadir of American race relations, and beyond:

"The leading men in the South still look upon the separation of the south from the Union as a hopeful probability. The devil is in them, and they will get up another rebellion if they see any chance of success. They exalt in private over the reduction of the regular army, which Congress foolishly cut down to 30,000 men, and they boast of having enough arms to organize an army at any time. Davis, Toombs and Stephens express the sentiments of the masses of the Southern people...[the plan is to] try to accomplish at the ballot-box and by legislation what they failed to do in the field...to get control of the National Government by the aid of the Democratic party, to destroy all the work of reconstruction, and during the administration of a Democratic President to reorganize the Southern Confederacy, after long and careful preparation."

— Parson Brownlow, August 1871

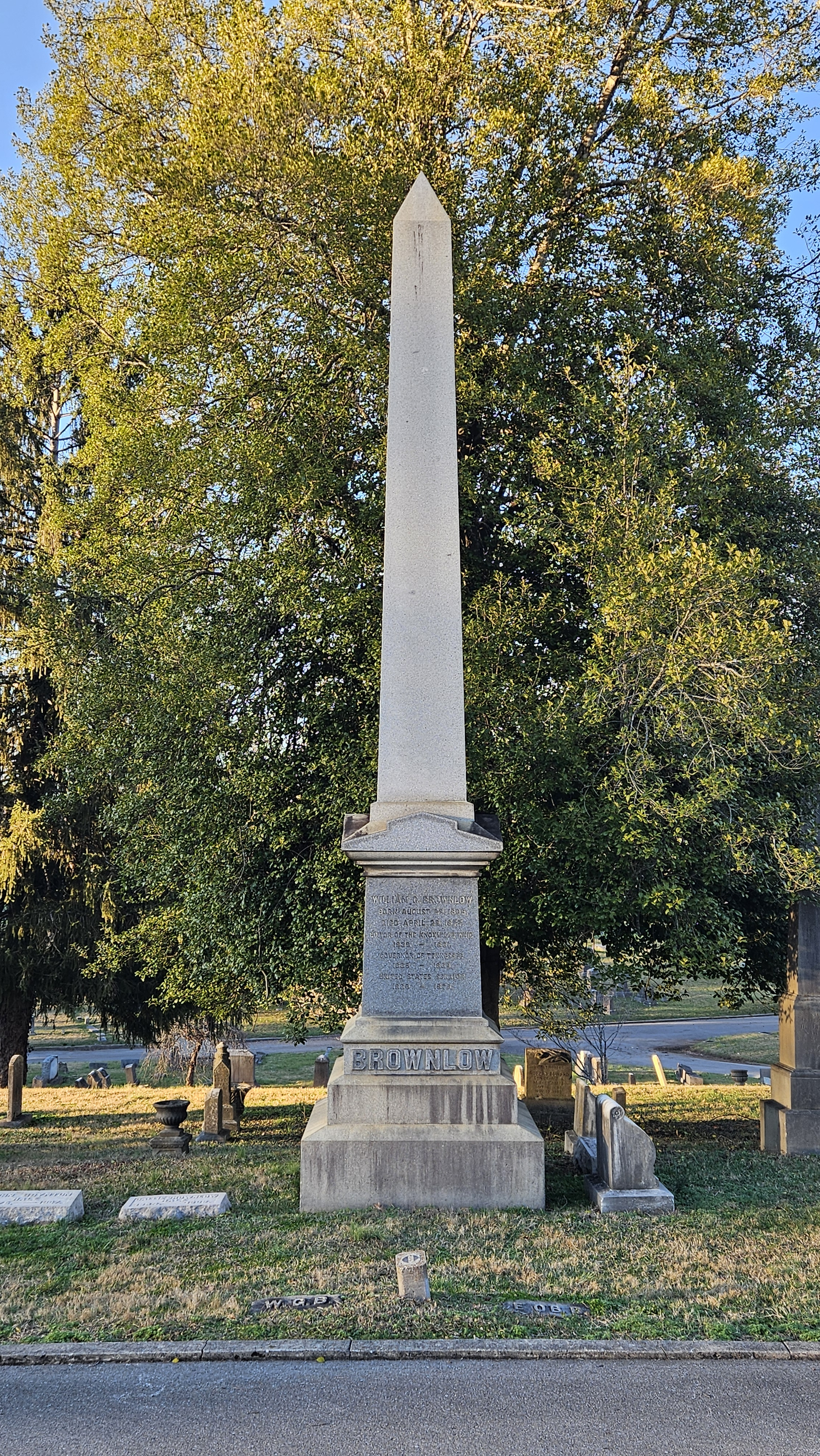
Brownlow grave at Knoxville's Old Gray Cemetery

After his Senate term ended in 1875, Brownlow returned to Knoxville. Governor Dewitt Clinton Senter had undone most of his Radical initiatives, allowing Democrats to regain control of the state government. Having sold the Whig in 1869, Brownlow purchased an interest in the Knoxville Chronicle, a Republican newspaper published by his old protégé, William Rule. The paper's name was changed to the Knoxville Whig and Chronicle. In 1876, Brownlow endorsed Rutherford B. Hayes for president. In December 1876 he spoke at the opening of Knoxville College, which had been established for the city's African-American residents.

On the night of April 28, 1877, Brownlow collapsed at his home, and died the following afternoon. The cause of death was given as "paralysis of the bowels." He was interred in Knoxville's Old Gray Cemetery following a funeral procession described by his colleague, Oliver Perry Temple, as the largest in the city's history up to that time.

== Legacy ==
Rule continued editing the Knoxville Chronicle, which was eventually renamed The Knoxville Journal. The Knoxville Journal remained one of Knoxville's daily newspapers until it folded in 1991. Adolph Ochs, who later became publisher of the New York Times, began his career at the Chronicle in the early 1870s.

Rule writes that Brownlow was "a master of invective and burning sarcasm, and he flourished in an age when such things were expected of a public journalist." J. Austin Sperry, Brownlow's rival editor in pre-Civil War Knoxville, admitted that Brownlow was a remarkable judge of human nature.

Temple writes of him:

It was easy for friends to persuade Mr. Brownlow to do anything that did not violate his sense of right; to force him was impossible. A child could lead him; a giant could not drive him. When his mind was once made up, it was as immovable as the mountains.

Brownlow remained a divisive figure for decades after his death. Historian Stephen Ash writes, "more than 120 years after his death, merely mentioning his name in the Volunteer State can evoke raucous laughter or bitter curses." Brownlow has been described as "Tennessee's worst governor," and the "most hated man in Tennessee History." A 1981 poll of 52 Tennessee historians that ranked the state's governors on ability, accomplishments, and statesmanship placed Brownlow last on the list. Journalist Steve Humphrey argues that Brownlow was a talented newspaper editor and reporter, as evidenced by his reporting on events such as the opening of the Gayoso Hotel in Memphis and Knoxville's 1854 cholera epidemic. The Capitol Committee of the Tennessee General Assembly removed the official portrait of Brownlow that had only been briefly installed during April 1987 within the Legislative Library of state capitol building, upon the recommendation of Democratic Tennessee State Senator Douglas Henry.

== Family ==
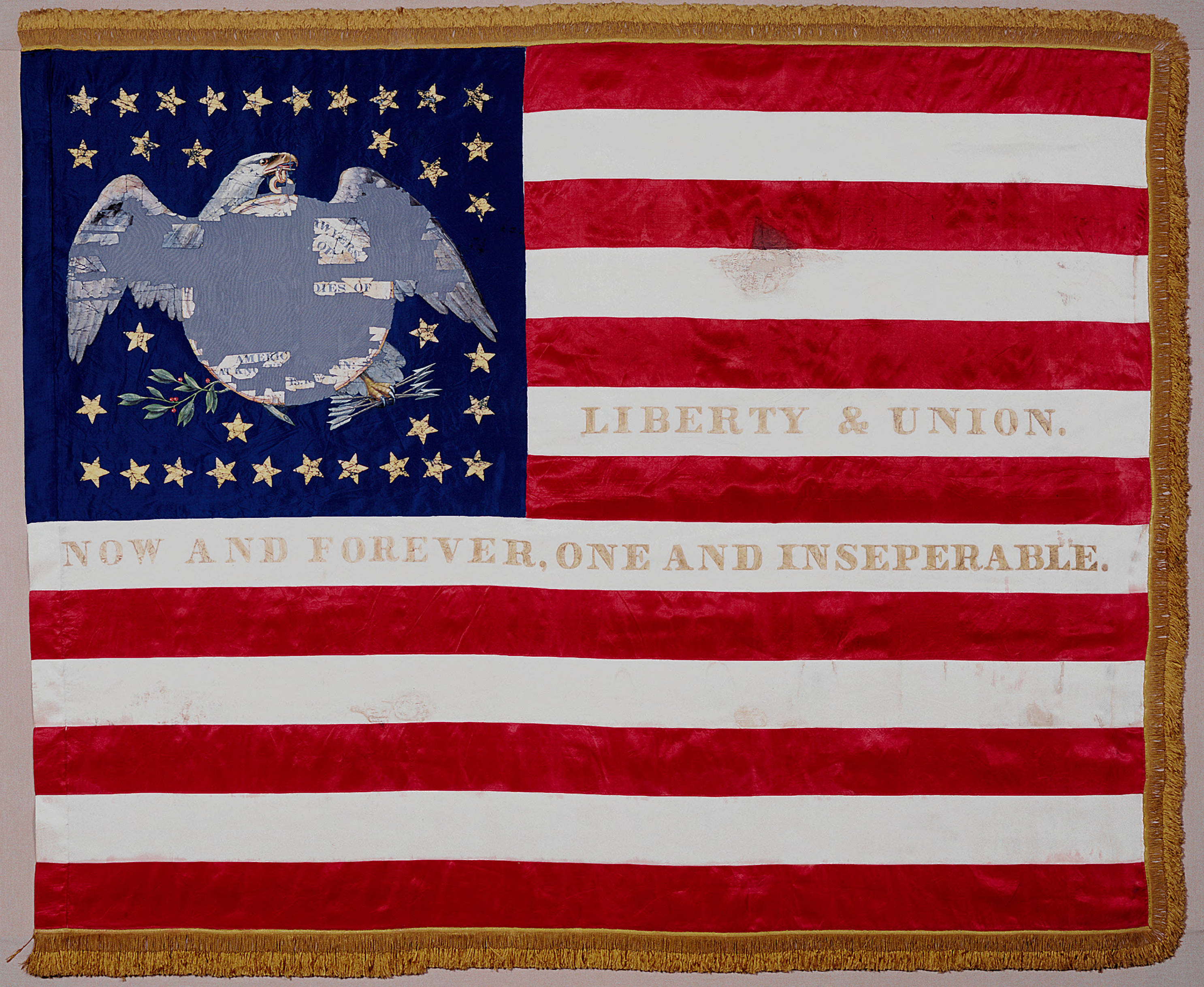
"Liberty & Union. Now & Forever, One and Inseperable" - 34-star U.S. flag given to Susan Brownlow by the Ladies of Philadelphia, June 13, 1862 (East Tennessee Historical Society)

Brownlow and his wife Eliza had seven children: Susan, John Bell, James Patton, Mary, Fannie, Annie, and Caledonia Temple. Eliza was a grand-niece of Edmund P. Gaines and George Strother Gaines. Her father was 25 years older than her mother; James O'Brien and three of his brothers operated iron mines in East Tennessee. Eliza lived at the family's home formerly on East Cumberland Avenue (at the present day James White Parkway) in Knoxville until her death in 1914 at age 94. In the 1890s and 1900s, numerous visitors, including three presidents (William McKinley, Theodore Roosevelt, and William Howard Taft) called on Eliza when visiting Knoxville.

John Bell Brownlow was a colonel in the Union Army during the Civil War. He worked for the federal government for most of his life, and in later years helped develop the Knoxville neighborhood (just north of modern Fourth and Gill) that for years was known as "Brownlow." Brownlow Elementary School, which served this neighborhood from 1913 to 1995, still stands and has been converted into urban lofts. James Patton Brownlow was also a colonel in the Union Army during the Civil War, though he was later brevetted to brigadier general by President Johnson. He served as an adjutant general in the state guard during his father's term as governor. Susan Brownlow Sawyers Boynton and her four younger sisters all survived to adulthood, married, and had children of their own.

Walter P. Brownlow, a nephew of Parson Brownlow, served as a U.S. congressman from Tennessee's 1st district from 1897 until his death. James Stewart Martin, another nephew of Parson Brownlow (the son of his sister Nancy), served as a U.S. congressman from Illinois in the mid-1870s. Louis Brownlow, a prominent 20th-century political scientist and city planner, was a grandson of one of Parson Brownlow's first cousins. He served a tumultuous 3-year term as Knoxville's city manager in the 1920s.

== Works ==
=== Newspapers ===
- The Whig, Brownlow's primary mouthpiece, was published under the following masthead titles:
  - Tennessee Whig (May 16, 1839 in Elizabethton – June 13, 1839)
  - Elizabethton Whig (June 13, 1839 in Elizabethton – nameplate change)
  - The Whig (May 6, 1840 in Jonesborough – November 3, 1841)
  - Jonesborough Whig (November 10, 1841 – May 11, 1842)
  - Jonesborough Whig and Independent Journal (May 18, 1842 – April 19, 1849)
  - Brownlow's Knoxville Whig and Independent Journal (May 19, 1849 in Knoxville – April 7, 1855)
  - Brownlow's Knoxville Whig (April 14, 1855 – July 27, 1861)
  - Brownlow's Weekly Whig (August 3, 1861 – October 26, 1861)
  - Brownlow's Knoxville Whig, and Rebel Ventilator (November 11, 1863 – February 21, 1866)
  - Brownlow's Knoxville Whig (February 28, 1866 – January 27, 1869)
  - Knoxville Weekly Whig (February 3, 1869 – March 1870)
  - Weekly Whig and Register (c. 1870 – 1871)
- The Knoxville Whig and Chronicle (1875–1877), co-owner with William Rule

=== Books ===
- Helps to the Study of Presbyterianism: Or, An Unsophisticated Exposition of Calvinism, with Hopkinsian Modifications and Policy, with a View to a More Easy Interpretation of the Same (1834)
- A Narrative of the Life, Travels, and Circumstances Incident Thereto, of William G. Brownlow (1834, a book supplement bound within Helps to the Study of Presbyterianism:)
- Baptism Examined: Or, the True State of the Case (1842)
- A Political Register, Setting Forth the Principles of the Whig and Locofoco Parties in the United States, With the Life and Public Services of Henry Clay (1844)
- Americanism Contrasted with Foreignism, Romanism and Bogus Democracy, In the Light of Reason, History, and Scripture; In Which Certain Demagogues in Tennessee, and Elsewhere, are Shown Up in Their True Colors (1856)
- The Great Iron Wheel Examined; Or, Its False Spokes Extracted, and an Exhibition of Elder Graves, Its Builder (1856)
- Sketches of the Rise, Progress, and Decline of Secession; With a Narrative of Personal Adventures Among the Rebels (1862)

=== Speeches and debates ===
- "Speech, Being a Reply to Thomas Dog Arnold, Ass, Who Appeared Before the Invitation, On Saturday Night, the 18th of September, 1852, in the Hearing of a Large Audience, and Assailed Said Brownlow" (Knoxville, Tennessee, September 19, 1852)
- "A Sermon on Slavery: A Vindication of the Methodist Church, South: Her Position Stated" (Knoxville, Tennessee, August 9, 1857)
- "Ought American Slavery to be Perpetuated? A Debate Between Rev. W.G. Brownlow and Rev. A. Pryne Held At Philadelphia, September, 1858" (1858)
- "Speech of Parson Brownlow, of Tennessee, Against the Great Rebellion" (New York, May 15, 1862)
- "Address to the Loyal People of Tennessee" (Knoxville, Tennessee, March 18, 1868)

Party political offices
First	Republican nominee for Governor of Tennessee; 1865, 1867	Succeeded by Dewitt Clinton Senter
Political offices
Preceded by Edward H. East; Acting Governor	Governor of Tennessee; 1865–1869	Succeeded by Dewitt Clinton Senter
U.S. Senate
Preceded by David T. Patterson	U.S. senator (Class 1) from Tennessee; 1869–1875; Served alongside: Joseph S. Fowler, Henry Cooper	Succeeded by Andrew Johnson
