= Susan Brownlow Boynton =

American Civil War folk heroine (1837–1913)

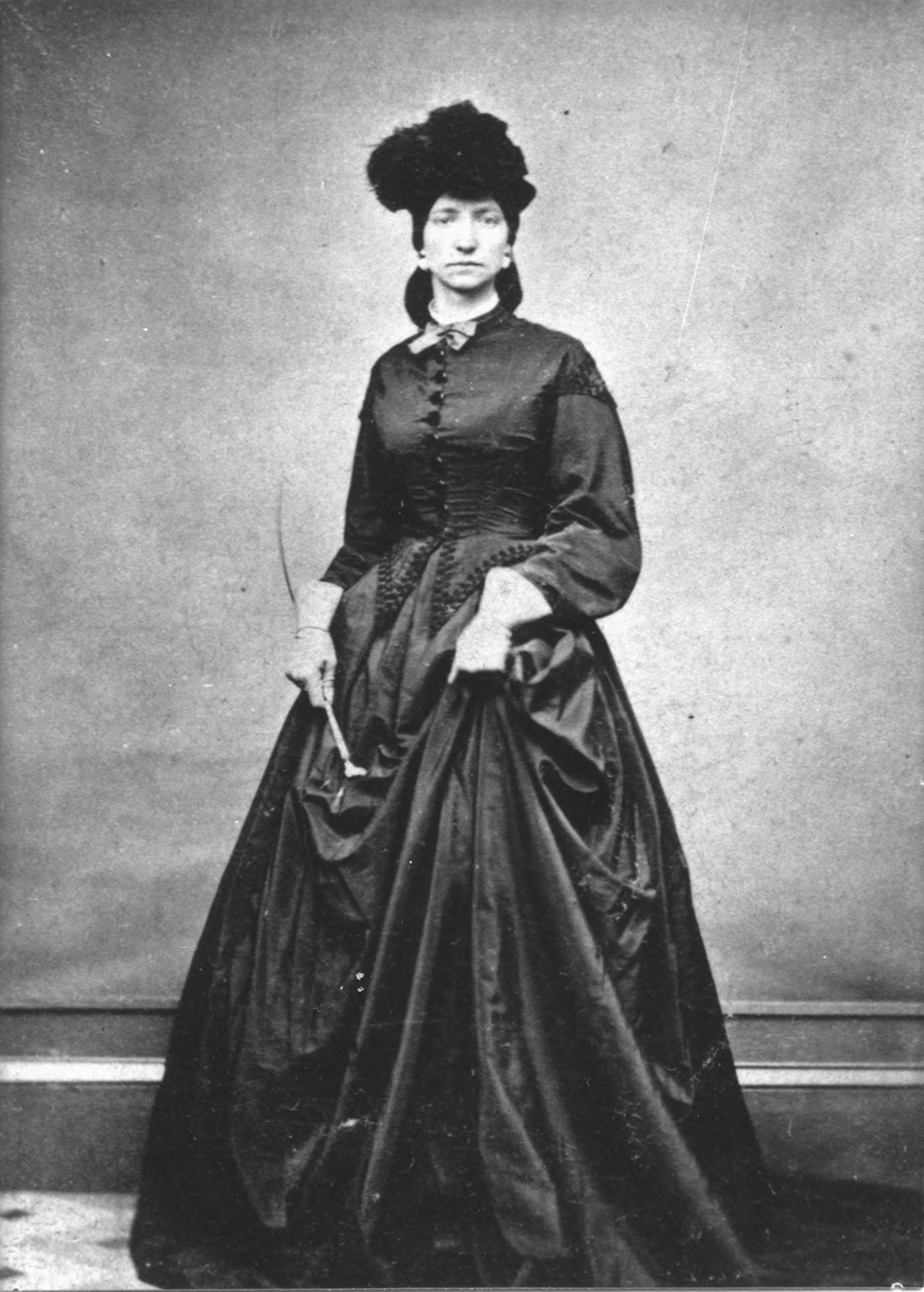
- Studio portrait of Susan Brownlow Sawyers Boynton (University of Tennessee Libraries)
- Born: Susan Brownlow; July 23, 1837; Kingsport, Tennessee, U.S.
- Died: March 12, 1913 (aged 75); Mountville, Pennsylvania, U.S.
- Known for: Loyalty to U.S. during American Civil War

Susan Brownlow Sawyers Boynton (July 23, 1837 – March 12, 1913) was a folk heroine of the American Civil War. The story, popularized by her father's book tour in 1862–63, was that Confederate soldiers had come to their family home demanding she pull down the Stars and Stripes, the flag of the United States. At great personal risk to herself she defended the family's and the nation's flag by running off the Rebels with a loaded pistol.

== Biography ==
Brownlow was from a Southern Unionist family of East Tennesseeans. Her father was the Whig, and later Radical Republican, politician and newspaper editor Parson Brownlow, and her two brothers were notable Union cavalry officers: John Bell Brownlow, who commanded the 9th Tennessee during the war, and James Patton Brownlow, a colonel of the 1st Tennessee.

Susan Brownlow was born July 23, 1837, in Kingsport, Tennessee, the first of William Gannaway Brownlow and Eliza O'Brien's eight children. Susan was married in October 1856 to James Houston Sawyers, a 24-year-old doctor. Dr. Sawyers contracted a contagious disease from one of his patients, dying young on May 22, 1858, leaving Susan widowed and six months pregnant. She moved back into her parents' Knoxville home, the one she became famous for defending. Her daughter Lillie Brownlow Sawyers was born September 9, 1858, and would have been about two or three years old at the time of the incident, which occurred in the first year or two of the war. Susan's four little sisters would likely have also been present in the home: 12-year-old Mary, nine-year-old Fanny, and the six-year-old twins Caledonia and Ann.

His daughter raised a flag over their house and some rebel soldiers entered it one day to take it down. The daughter with a loaded and cocked revolver stood at the foot of the stairway leading to the attic and defied them. She drove them away and when we passed the house on our way to camp, Sept. 1st, the day of our arrival, the sacred flag was floating in the breeze. Every soldier in our command saluted the flag and cheered the brave and loyal woman. It was a dramatic scene.

— "Recollections of the War between the States" by H.C. Connelly (1913)

She accompanied her father on his 1862 book tour and was presented with a silk flag in Philadelphia and a Colt revolver in Connecticut. Her story was retold in quasi-fictionalized form in the 1864 book Miss Martha Brownlow, or the Heroine of Tennessee. Major Reynolds, the author of the book, changed the main character's name from Susan Sawyers to Martha Brownlow for unknown reasons, perhaps to avoid needing to pay her royalties or possibly for security during the ongoing war.

She was remarried in 1865 to Dr. Daniel Boynton, a Knoxville physician with whom she had three daughters, Lucile, Ednee, and Ilia, and a son, who also became a doctor. Boynton had been an assistant surgeon with the 104th Ohio Infantry during the war and afterward became a federal pension agent in Knoxville. At some point Susan had a sixth child who died young. Boynton died January 7, 1888. Susan died of uraemia in Mountville, Pennsylvania, at the home of her son Dr. Emerson Boynton in 1913. She was buried in the family plot at Old Gray Cemetery in Knoxville not far from the graves of both of her husbands. Susan's chief characteristics were said to be "unfailing cheerfulness and generosity."

== Gallery ==
Susan Brownlow Boynton (1837–1913)
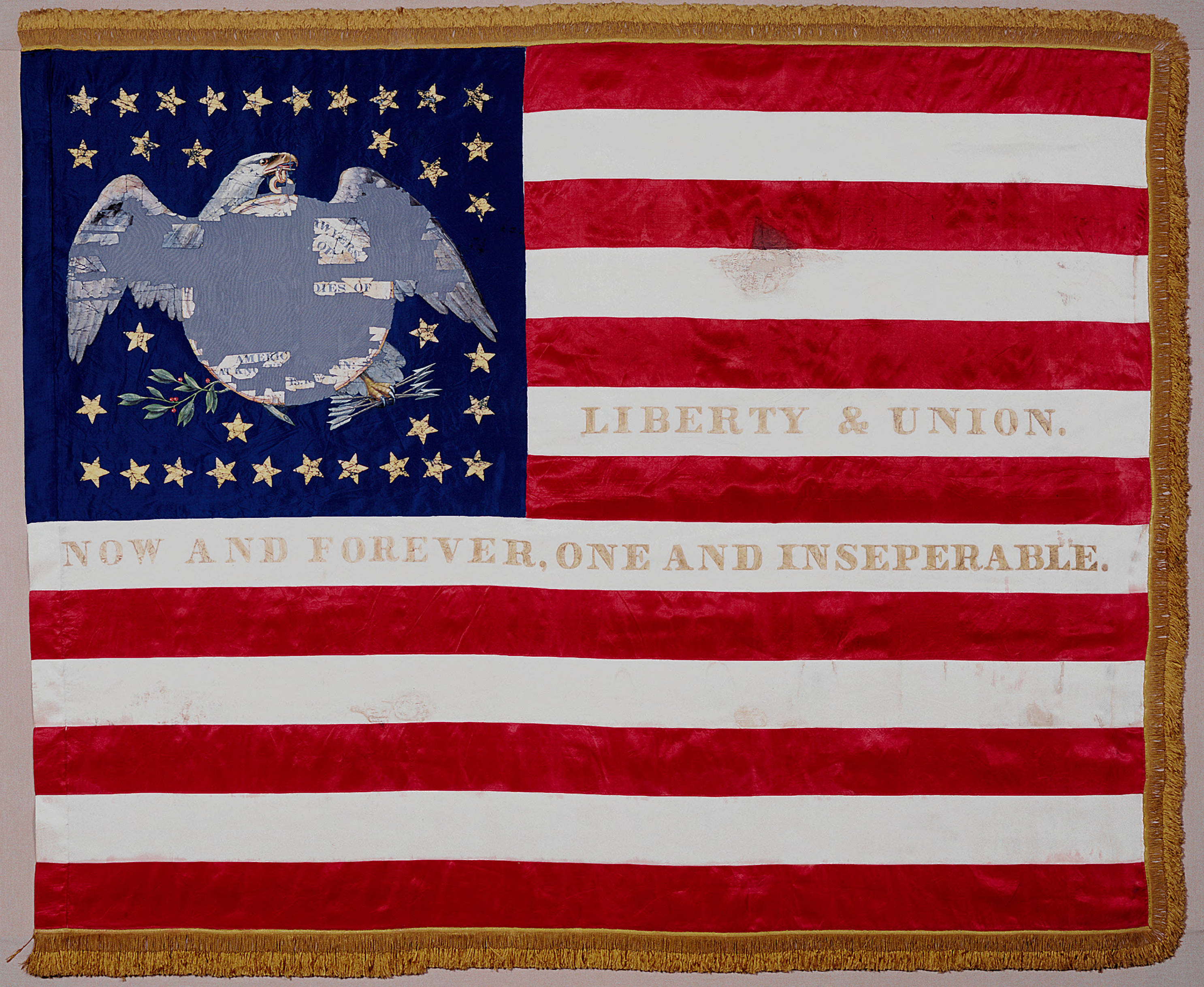
"Liberty & Union. Now & Forever, One and Inseperable" - U.S. flag given to Susan Brownlow Sawyers by the Ladies of Philadelphia, June 13, 1862 (East Tennessee Historical Society)

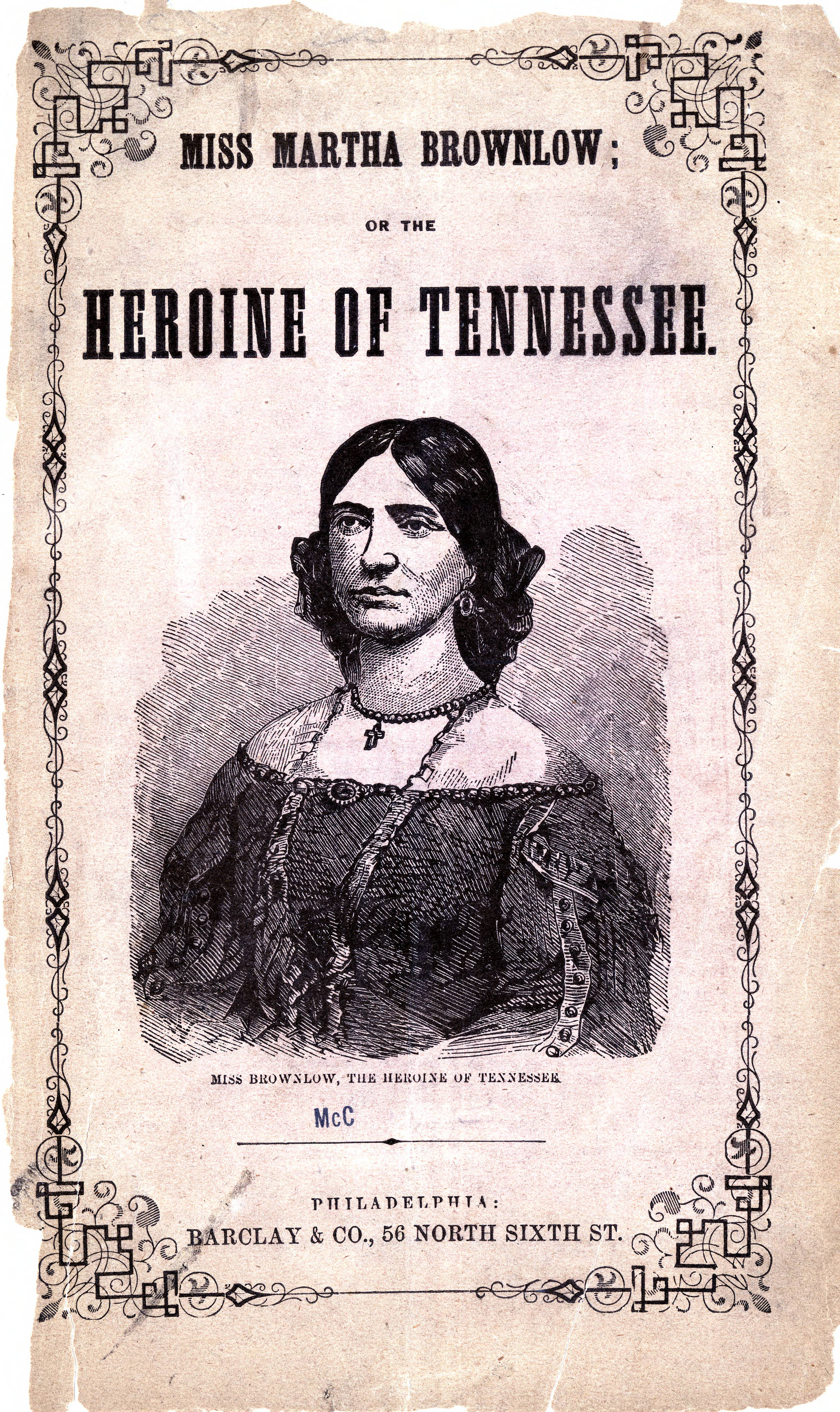
The Heroine of Tennessee, 1863 (McClung Historical Collection, Knoxville Public Library)

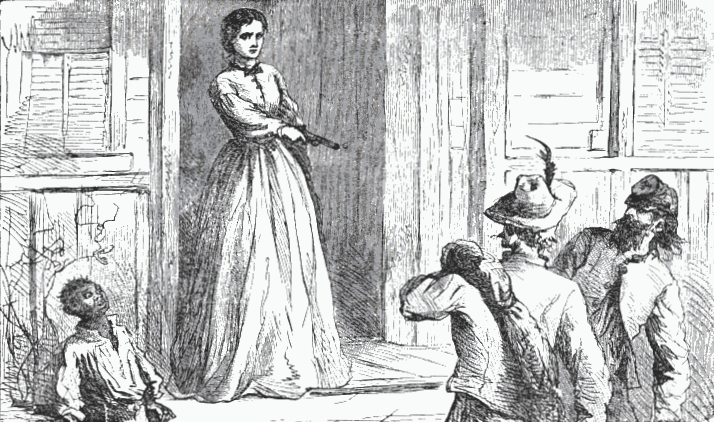
Susan Brownlow defends the flag (Illustration from Michael Egan, The Flying, Gray-Haired Yank, 1888)

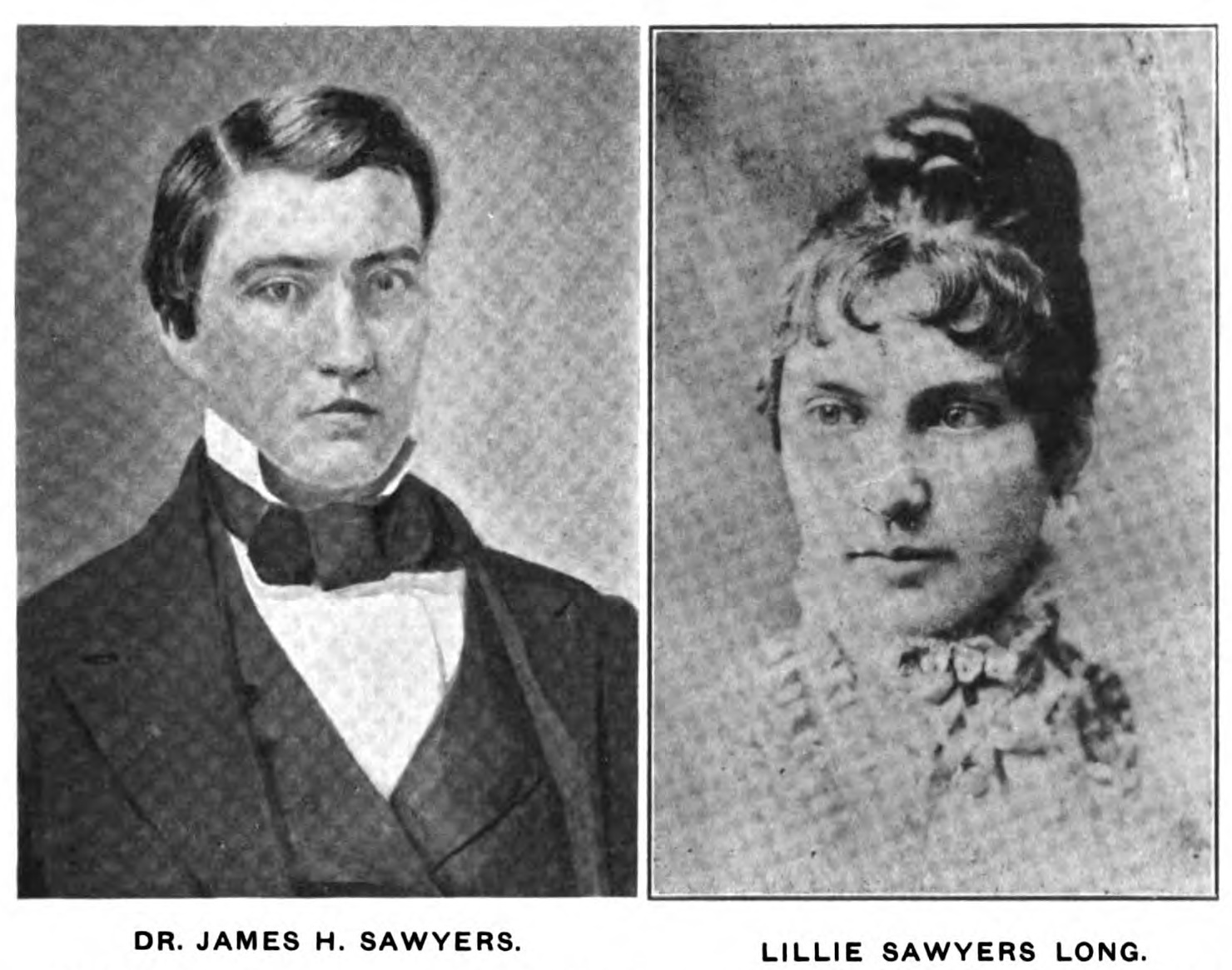
Dr. James Houston Sawyers and Lillie Sawyers Long (photos published 1913)
