= 1865 Tennessee gubernatorial election =

- March 4, 1865
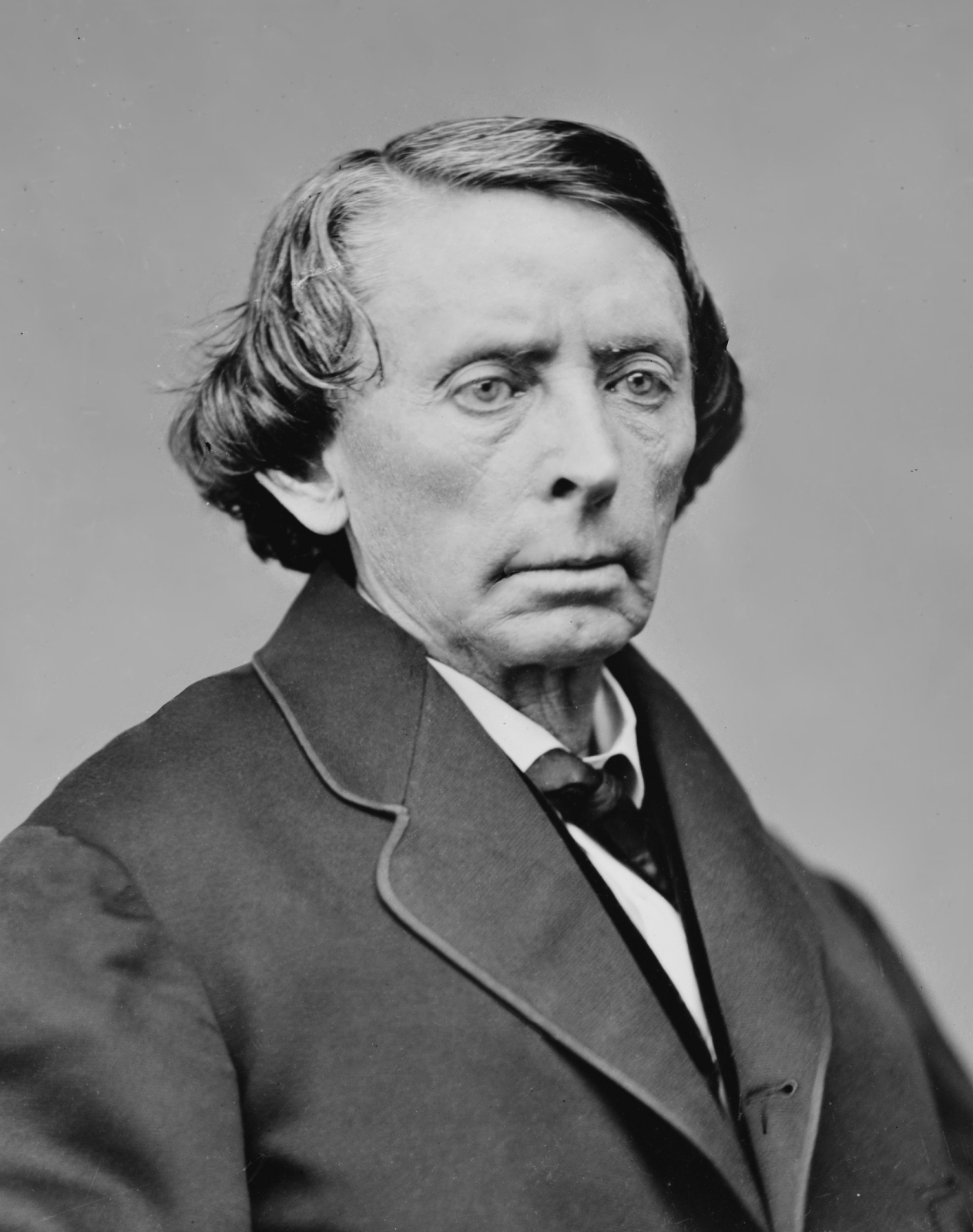
Nominee	Parson Brownlow
Party	National Union
Popular vote	23,352 (Note: Dubin gives Brownlow 22,814 votes and does not mention other votes.)
Percentage	99.85%
- County results Brownlow: >90% No votes
Governor before election
Edward H. East
Nonpartisan
Elected Governor
Parson Brownlow
National Union

The 1865 Tennessee gubernatorial election was held on March 4, 1865, to elect the next governor of Tennessee. Union candidate Parson Brownlow was elected virtually without opposition.

Abraham Lincoln appointed Andrew Johnson military governor of Tennessee on March 12, 1862, following a series of military victories that left the Union Army in control of most of the state. Johnson was subsequently elected vice president on the National Union ticket in 1864, succeeding Lincoln's first vice president, Hannibal Hamlin. He appointed Edward H. East to serve as acting governor between his inauguration as vice president on March 4, 1865, and the inauguration of the elected civilian governor.

Tennessee Unionists split during the 1864 United States presidential election between supporters of Lincoln and his Democratic challenger, George B. McClellan. Following the election, the Lincoln–Johnson state executive committee called for a convention of "Union men" to meet at Nashville on December 19; military conditions forced the postponement of the gathering until January 8, 1865.

Delegates to the Nashville Union convention nominated Brownlow for governor on January 14, 1865. No other candidate challenged Brownlow for the nomination. A constitutional referendum on February 22 preceded the gubernatorial election on March 4. Convinced that the Nashville convention had been an illegal assembly, conservative Unionists called for an election boycott, while the Ironclad Oath disenfranchised Confederate sympathizers as well as many McClellan supporters. Brownlow published an editorial attacking the conservatives in which he claimed the true choice in the election was between the "Radical Union Party," including all those who had supported Lincoln and Johnson in the last presidential election, and the defeated Confederates, of whom the conservative faction were the unwitting dupes.

Brownlow faced only token opposition in the general election, receiving all but 35 votes out of more than 23,000 cast. The total vote met the threshold established under the ten percent plan, which allowed the former Confederate states to hold elections as soon as 10 percent of voters swore loyalty to the United States. Tennessee was subsequently readmitted to representation in the United States Congress in 1866 without having to undergo congressional Reconstruction.

== General election ==
1865 Tennessee gubernatorial election
Party	Candidate	Votes	%	±%
National Union	Parson Brownlow	23,352	99.85	
Write-in		35	0.15%	
Total votes		23,387	100.00	

== Bibliography ==
- Alexander, Thomas B. (1950). Political Reconstruction in Tennessee. New York: Russell and Russell.
- Alexander, Thomas B. (1969). "Political Reconstruction in Tennessee, 1865–1870". In Curry, Richard Orr (ed.). Radicalism, Racism, and Party Realignment: The Border States during Reconstruction. Baltimore: Johns Hopkins Press. pp. 37–79.
- Dubin, Michael J. (2014). United States Gubernatorial Elections, 1861–1911: The Official Results by State and County. Jefferson, NC: McFarland & Company.
- Coulter, E. Merton (1999). William G. Brownlow: Fighting Parson of the Southern Highlands. Knoxville: University of Tennessee Press.
- Graf, Leroy P.; Haskins, Ralph S., eds. (1979). The Papers of Andrew Johnson. Vol. 5, 1861–1862. Knoxville: University of Tennessee Press.
- Foner, Eric (2014). Reconstruction: America's Unfinished Revolution, 1863–77 (Revised ed.). New York: HarperPerennial. ISBN 978-0-06-235451-8.
- McKinney, Gordon B. (1978). Southern Mountain Republicans, 1865–1900: Politics and the Appalachian Community. Chapel Hill: University of North Carolina Press.
- Miscamble, Wilson D.; Miscamble, William G. (Fall 1978). "Andrew Johnson and the Election of William G. ("Parson") Brownlow As Governor or Tennessee". Tennessee Historical Quarterly. 37 (3): 308–20.
