= 1867 Tennessee gubernatorial election =

- August 1, 1867
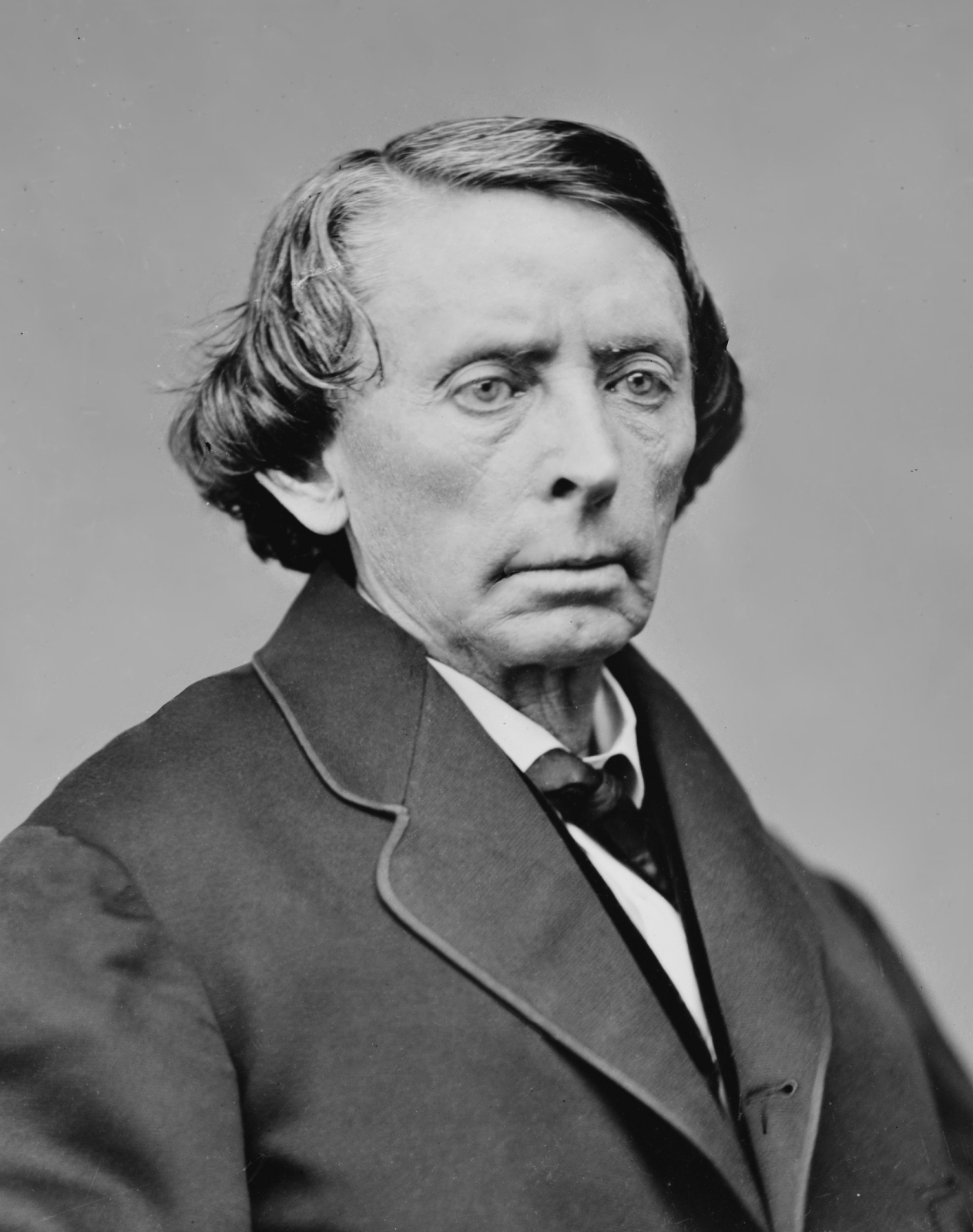

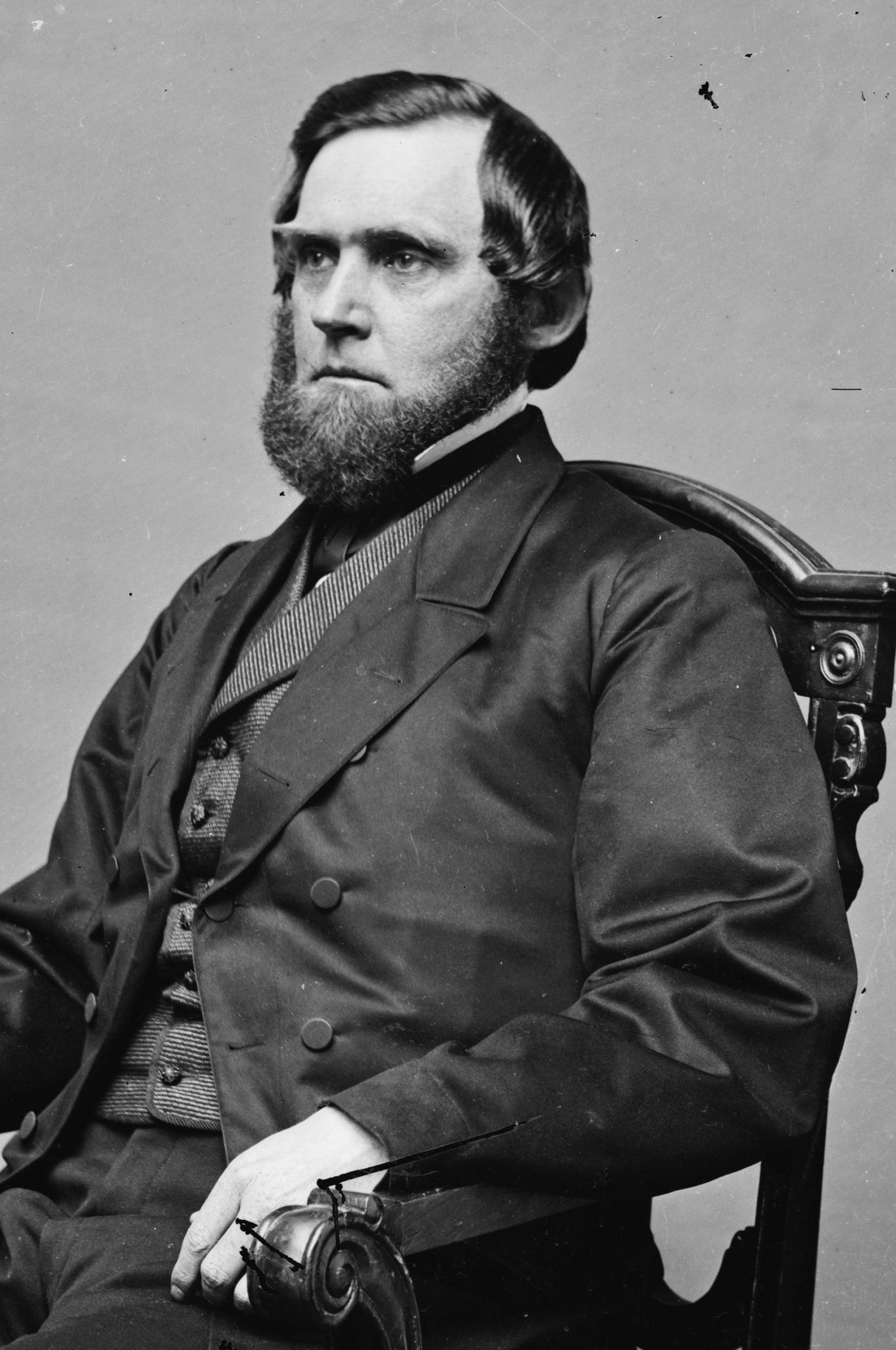
Nominee	Parson Brownlow	Emerson Etheridge
Party	Republican	Conservative
Popular vote	74,484	22,440
Percentage	76.85%	23.15%
- County results Brownlow: 50–60% 60–70% 70–80% 80–90% >90% Etheridge: 50–60% 60–70% 70–80% 80–90% >90% No data
Governor before election
Parson Brownlow
Republican
Elected Governor
Parson Brownlow
Republican

The 1867 Tennessee gubernatorial election was held on August 1, 1867, to elect the governor of Tennessee. Incumbent Republican governor Parson Brownlow defeated Conservative nominee Emerson Etheridge with 76.85% of the vote.

== Background ==
Tennessee was brought back into the United States in 1866, without having gone through Congressional Reconstruction. Governor Parson Brownlow, a Radical Republican, oversaw the passage of legislation that required loyalty oaths in order to vote. Legislation giving suffrage to black people was passed on February 26, 1867.

== Campaign ==
The Tennessee Republican Party held its convention on February 22, 1867, and gave its gubernatorial nomination to Brownlow by acclamation.

Twenty-four members of the state legislature who opposed Brownlow called the Conservative Union State Convention. The Conservative Party voted unanimously to give its gubernatorial nomination to former Whig congressman Emerson Etheridge, who was nominated by Edmund Cooper, on April 16, 1867. The convention was attended by John Baxter, Elias Polk, William B. Campbell, Dorsey B. Thomas, and others. Etheridge accepted the nomination on April 19.

Brownlow stated that Tennessee was "the only stronghold Republicanism has in the South". The Union League campaigned in the state for Republicans and courted the black vote. The Freedmen's Bureau offered financial assistance to black people whose employment was targeted by Conservatives for registering to vote and supporting Republicans. Brownlow increased the size of the militia to protect black people from intimidation. Brownlow was unable to campaign as he lost his voice and instead had other Republicans, including Secretary of State Andrew J. Fletcher, campaign for him.

== General election ==
Brownlow won the election. The Republicans also won every seat in the concurrent U.S. House of Representatives election and almost every seat in the state legislature. Brownlow left office in 1869, after being appointed to the United States Senate, and was replaced by Dewitt Clinton Senter.

1867 Tennessee gubernatorial election
Party	Candidate	Votes	%	±%
Republican	Parson Brownlow (incumbent)	74,484	76.85%	
Conservative	Emerson Etheridge	22,440	23.15%	
Total votes		96,924	100.00%	

== Endorsements ==
Emerson Etheridge

Federal officials

- Thomas Amos Rogers Nelson, member of the United States House of Representatives from Tennessee's 1st congressional district (1859-1861)

State legislators

- John Baxter, Speaker of the North Carolina House of Representatives (1852-1854)
- John M. Fleming, member of the Tennessee House of Representatives (1861-1862; 1869-1871)
- John Netherland, member of the Tennessee Senate (1833-1835) and Tennessee House of Representatives (1835-1836; 1851-1853)
