= John Bell Brownlow =

American military officer (1839–1922)

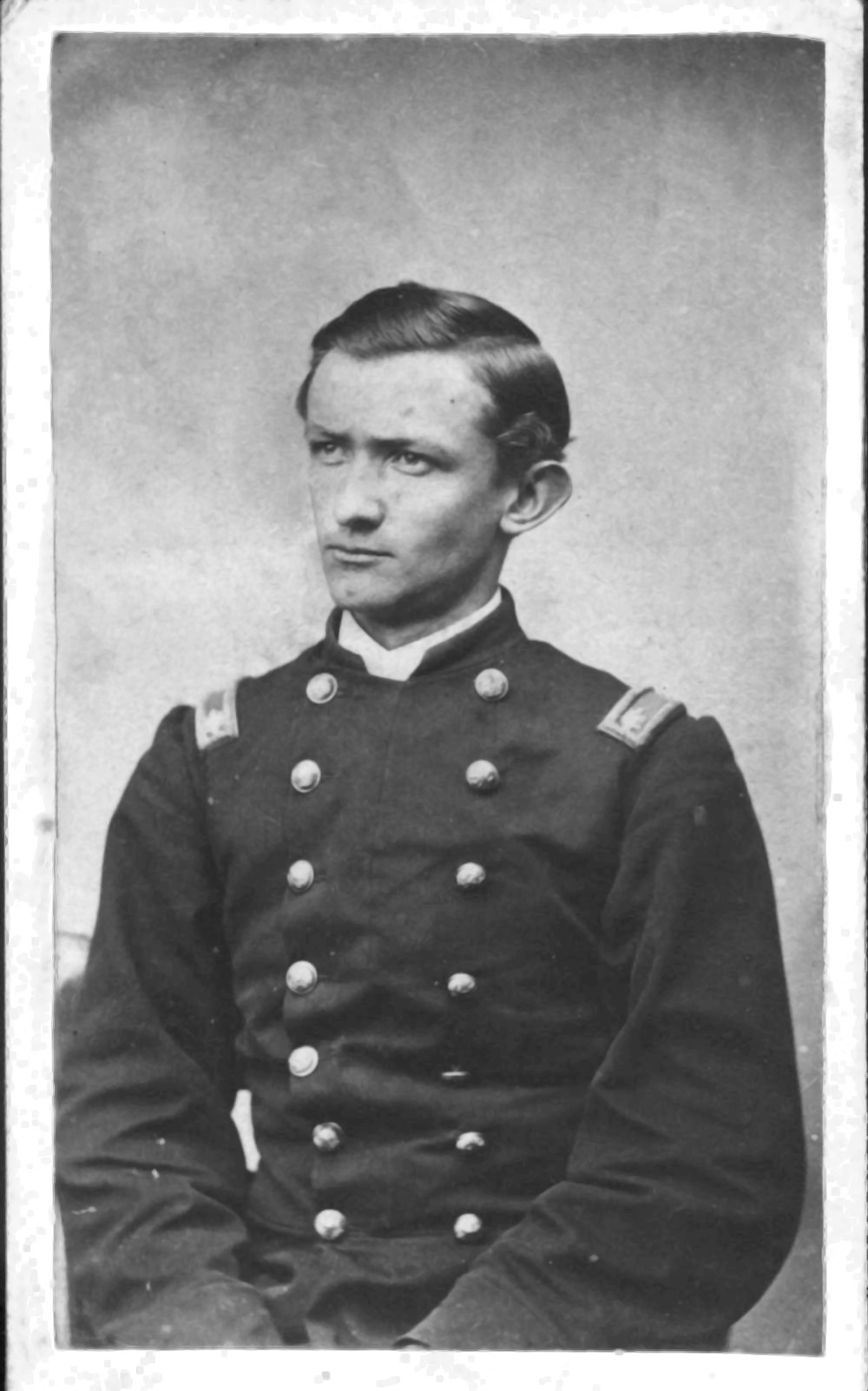
- Born: October 19, 1839; Elizabethton, Tennessee, U.S.
- Died: October 26, 1922 (aged 83); Knoxville, Tennessee, U.S.
- Occupations: Army officer, bureaucrat, newspaper editor, real-estate investor

John Bell Brownlow (October 19, 1839 – October 26, 1922) was an American military officer, newspaper editor, government administrator, and real estate developer. The older of Parson Brownlow's two sons, Brownlow was a Southern Unionist who served as colonel in the United States (Union) cavalry in the Civil War. After the war, he joined his father in editing East Tennessee newspapers, and in later life, he became a real estate developer in his hometown of Knoxville, Tennessee.

== Biography ==
Born at Elizabethton in Carter County, Tennessee, Brownlow was named for U.S. Senator John Bell. His nickname was "Belt." John was the second-born of the eight Brownlow children. He went to school at Emory and Henry College in Virginia, where in 1860, he apparently accidentally killed a fellow student named James W. Reese. According to the Parson, the fatal blow to the head was in self-defense. He was acquitted at trial. Per W. G. Brownlow, the judge told the jury he "would have rendered the same verdict if he had been one of their number."

In June 1861 the Parson heard tell Andrew Johnson, returning from a trip to Kingston, would inadvertently be boarding a train that carried 2,000 Confederate troops. He sent John Bell Brownlow to get a good horse and buggy and get Johnson out of Kingston before he encountered the rebels. Upon arrival, Johnson told young Brownlow, "I thank you for all the trouble you've taken and your father and yourself for your kindness, but I own several thousand dollars in stock in this railroad and I will be damned if I will be driven from traveling on it by the damned traitors of the Cotton States!" (Johnson's traveling companions T.A.R. Nelson and Connally Trigg eventually persuaded him to go with J. B. Brownlow by buggy.)

Brownlow served as colonel of the 9th Tennessee from June 1, 1863, until the end of the American Civil War. His younger brother James P. Brownlow was colonel of the 1st Tennessee (Union). Their maternal uncle Alfred J. O'Brien was a colonel in the 13th Mississippi of the Confederate States Army. John B. Brownlow was credited with recruiting about 600 men, or six companies worth, to his regiment. According to one obituary, his official rank may have been lieutenant colonel, but "He commanded the regiment in all the engagements in which it participated, the colonel of the regiment not being with that unit during the war." Along with Alven Gillem, John K. Miller, and W. H. Ingerton, he was one of the colonels who led the raid that killed John Hunt Morgan at Greeneville.

Brownlow took over his father's newspaper, the Whig, when the latter was elected governor of Tennessee, and ran it until 1869, when it was sold. The younger Brownlow served as his father's private secretary when he was in the U.S. Senate. In 1872, he married Fannie Fouché, daughter of Dr. John Fouché. John B. Brownlow then worked in the Post Office and the U.S. Treasury Departments in Washington, D.C. for about 27 years. At the Treasury Department, he was a special representative of the IRS responsible for investigating fraud. He also represented the U.S. government on the boards of directors at five American world's fairs including the 1904 Louisiana Purchase Exposition in St. Louis. At the Buffalo Exposition, he saw "Leon Czolgosz attempting to surge through the great crowd to get near President McKinley to fire the assassin's bullet. He saw the wrapped hand as the anarchist carried it in a sling but thought the man merely had an injured hand, and thought he was anxious, like all the others, to see and shake the hand of President McKinley."

Brownlow was discharged from federal service by President Theodore Roosevelt after criticizing Postmaster General Sereno Payne. He then entered real estate in Knoxville in partnership with two of his sons.

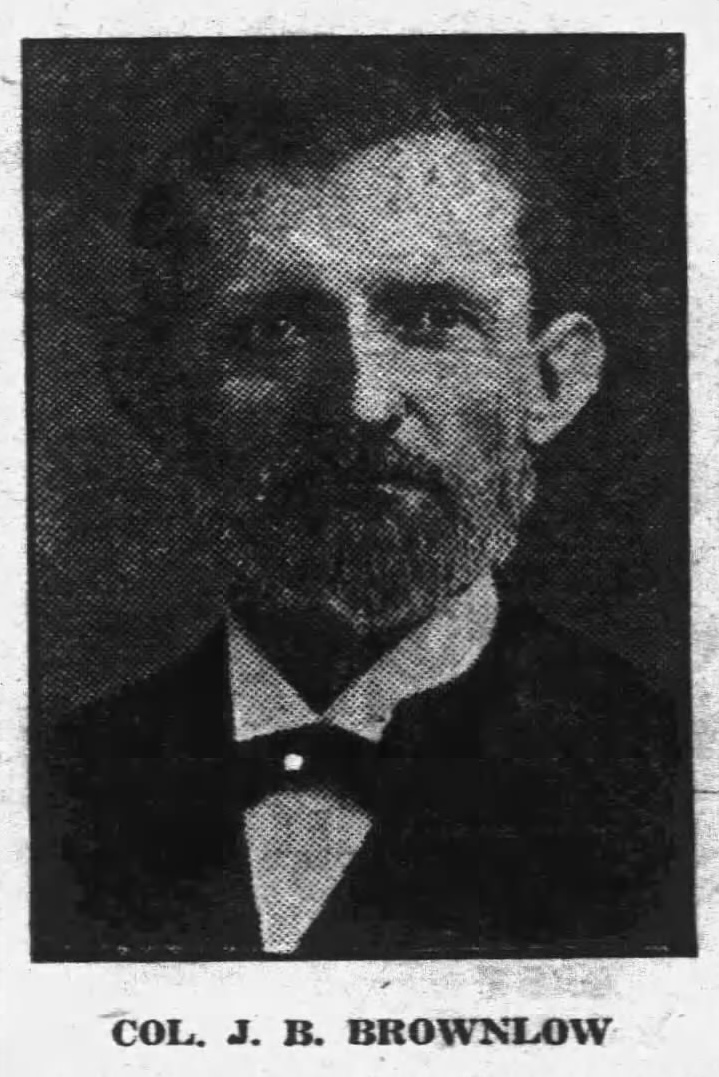
Brownlow in later life

During his lifetime, Brownlow was often called upon for his recollections of politics and Tennesseans in the years before, during and after the Civil War. For example, in 1920, he wrote a letter retelling his father's alignment with John Bell, his own meeting with Douglas in his father's stead, and his father's determination that Mary Todd Lincoln be granted a government pension of $5,000 per year despite the fact that many of the other committee members deemed Mrs. Lincoln a "curse to her husband."

Brownlow died in Knoxville, Tennessee at age 83 and was buried in Old Gray Cemetery. He was survived by two sons and a daughter.
