= Nameplate (publishing) =

Newspaper front page header

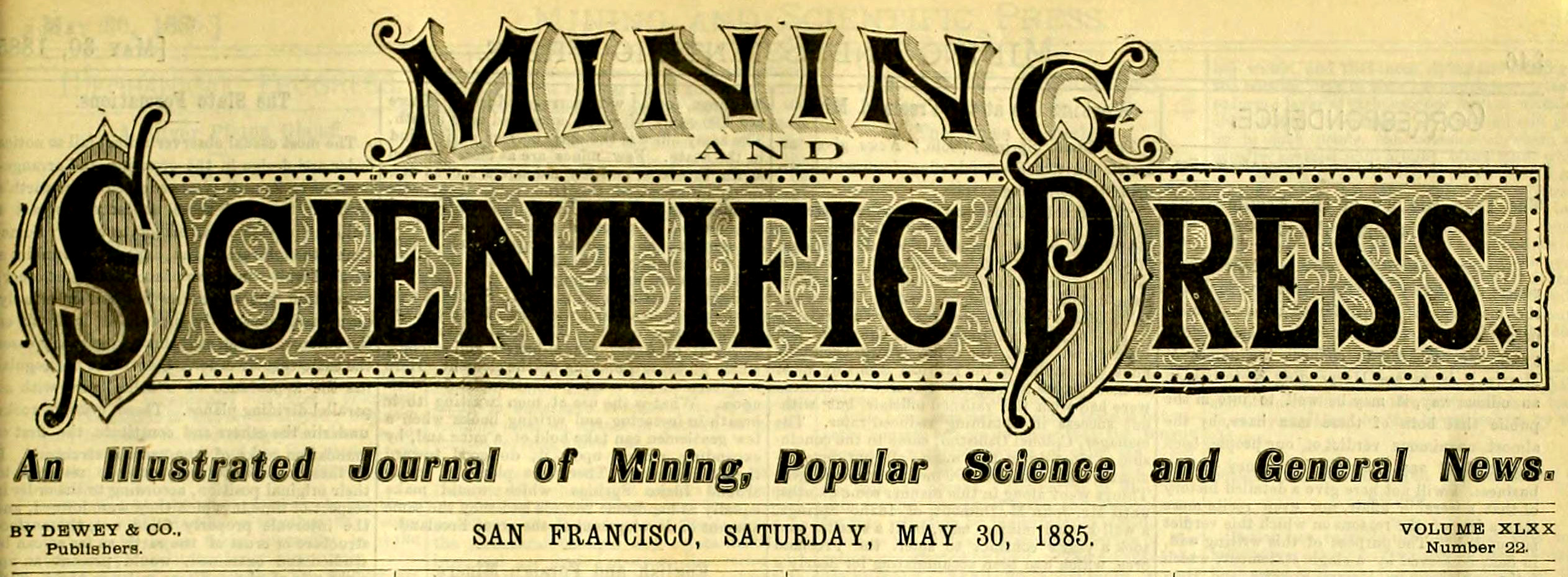
Nameplate of the Mining and Scientific Press in 1885

Nameplate of The Rensselaer Polytechnic student newspaper

Masthead of Daily Record features a rampant lion to the right of the word "Daily"

The nameplate (American English) or masthead (British English) of a newspaper or periodical is its designed title as it appears on the front page or cover. Another very common term for it in the newspaper industry is "the flag". It is part of the publication's branding, with a specific font and, usually, color. It may include other details besides the name, such as ornamentation, a subtitle, or motto. For example, the masthead of The Times of London includes the British Royal Arms between the words "The" and "Times". Another example is the masthead of Daily Record of Scotland, which includes an ornamental lion in the "rampant" attitude to the right of the word "Daily".

== See also ==
- Masthead (American publishing)
