= 1872 United States House of Representatives elections in Tennessee =

1872 Tennessee's at-large congressional district special election
- November 5, 1872
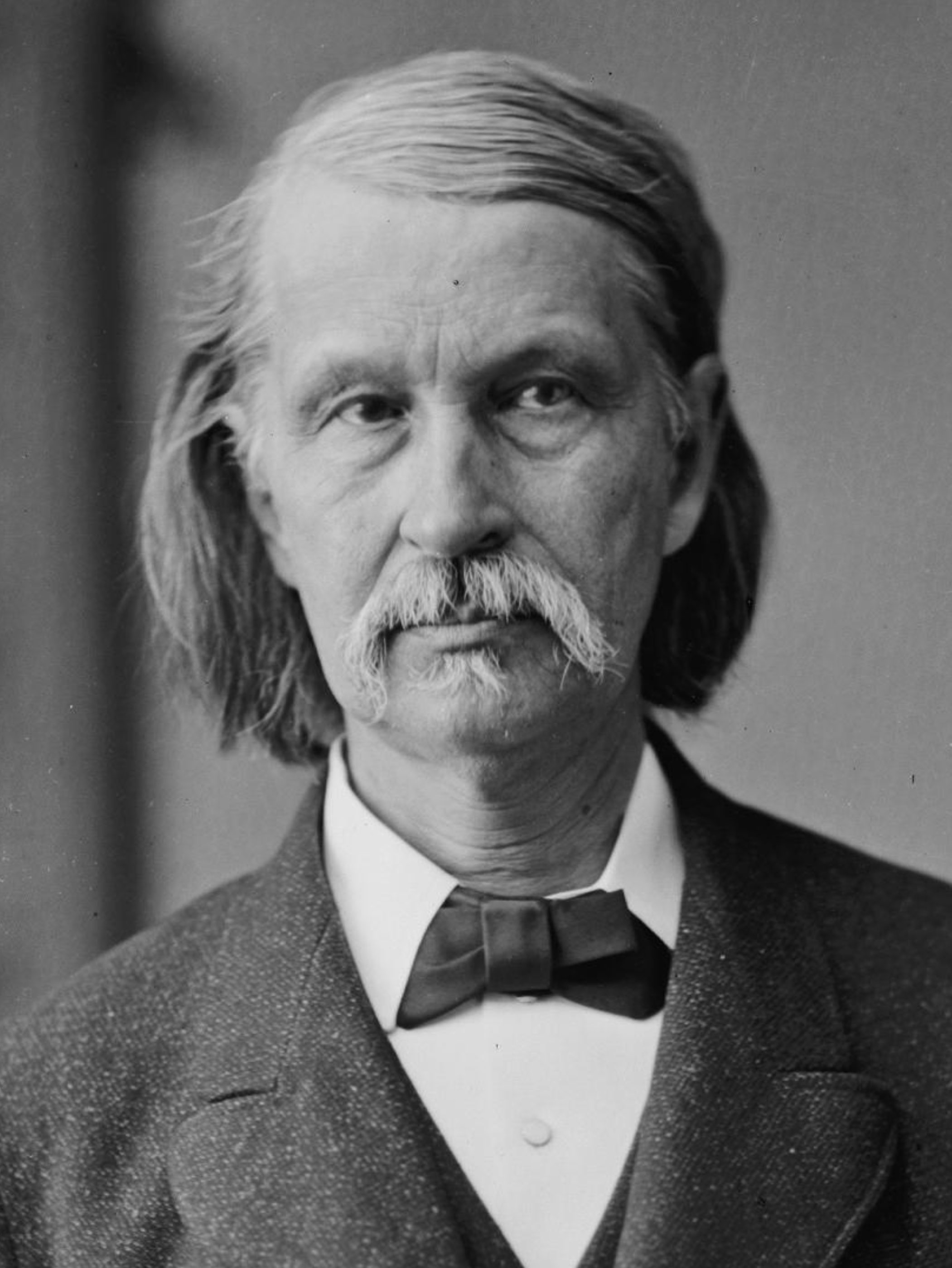

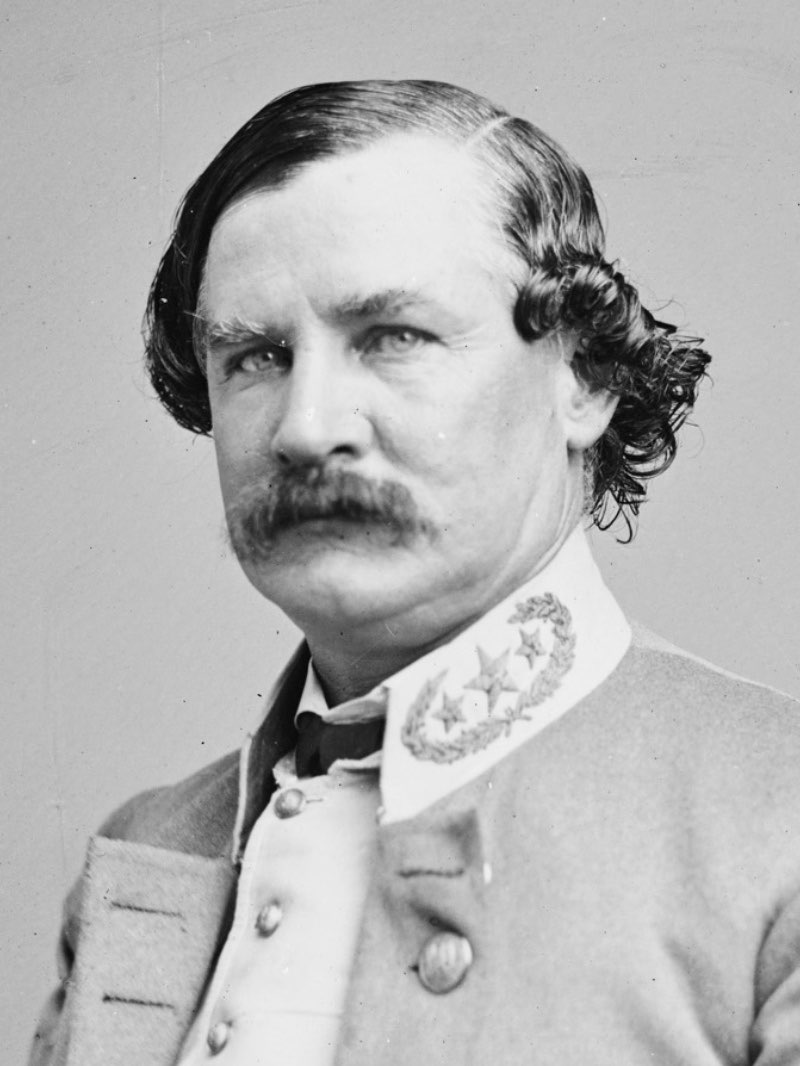

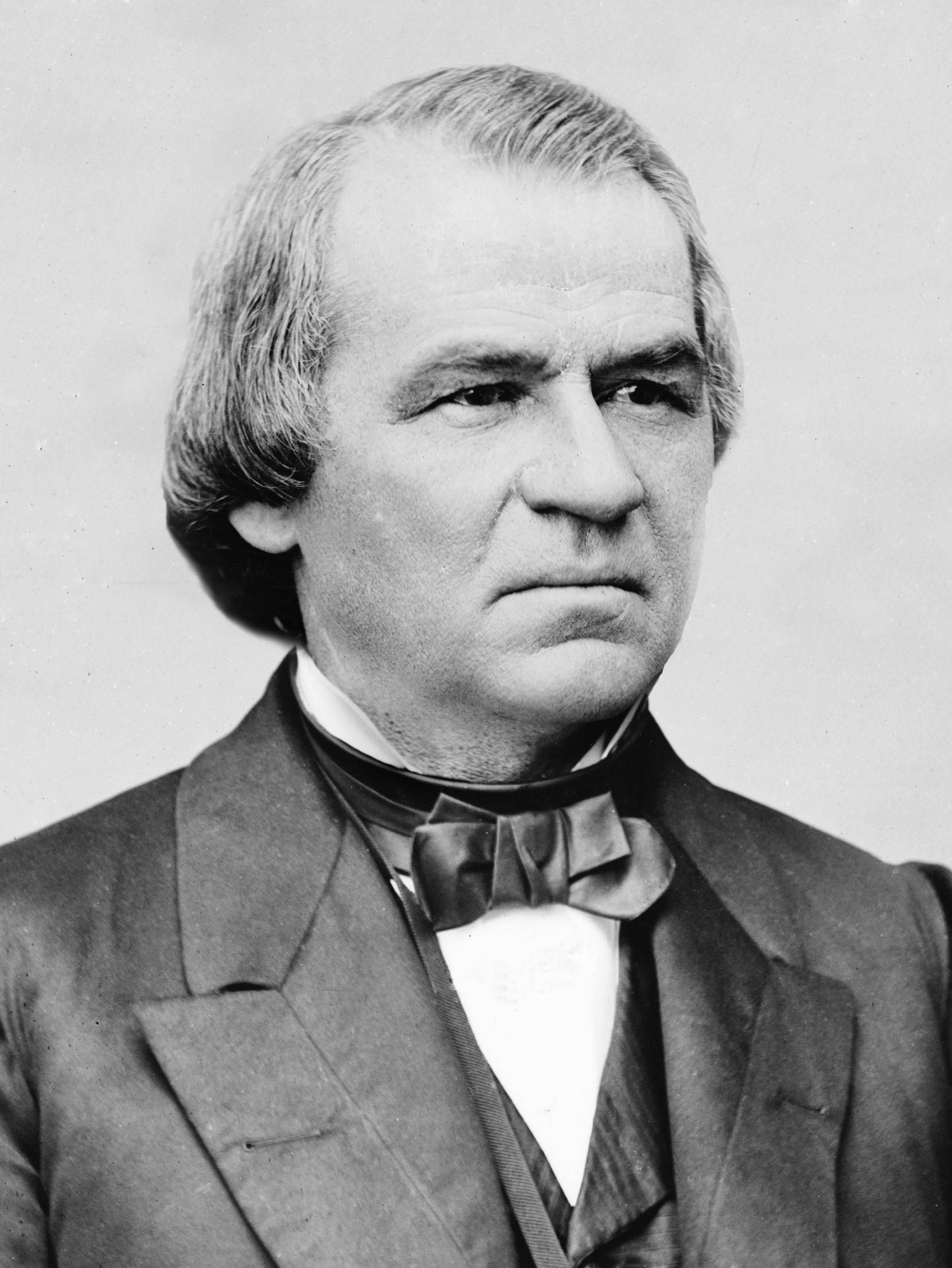
Nominee	Horace Maynard	Benjamin F. Cheatham	Andrew Johnson
Party	Republican	Democratic	Independent
Popular vote	80,825	65,188	37,900
Percentage	43.95%	35.45%	20.61%

Maynard:
30–40%
40–50%
50–60%
60–70%
70–80%
80–90%
>90%
Cheatham:
30–40%
40–50%
50–60%
60–70%
70–80%
80–90%
>90%
Johnson:
30–40%
50–60%
No data:
U.S. Representative before election
Horace Maynard
Republican
Elected U.S. Representative
Horace Maynard
Republican

The 1872 congressional elections in Tennessee was held on November 5, 1872, to determine who will represent the state of Tennessee in the United States House of Representatives. These elections were the first under Tennessee's new congressional map after redistricting was completed by the state government. Tennessee gained 2 extra seats, including Tennessee's at-large congressional district. Republican Horace Maynard was redistricted from the 2nd district to the new at-large district.

Maynard was re-elected to the at-large congressional district's special election, defeating Democrat and former Confederate General Benjamin F. Cheatham and former President Andrew Johnson who ran as an independent.

For the Congressional district elections, Republicans gained 4 seats, while Democrats lost 3 seats. Including the at-large congressional district, the Tennessee delegation became a 7-3 Republican majority.

1872 United States House of Representatives elections in Tennessee
- November 5, 1872

All 10 Tennessee seats to the United States House of Representatives
	Majority party	Minority party
Party	Republican	Democratic
Last election	2	6
Seats won	7	3
Seat change	▲5	▼3
Popular vote	81,767	87,729
Percentage	45.77%	49.11%
Republican:
30–40%
40–50%
50–60%
Democratic:
50–60%
60–70%

== Overview ==
=== Statewide ===
Party	Votes	Percentage	Seats Before	Seats After	+/–
Republican	81,767	45.77%	2	7	▲5
Democratic	87,729	49.11%	6	3	▼3
Independents	9,150	5.12%	0	0	Steady
Totals	178,646	100.00%	8	10	0

Popular vote
Democratic	49.11%
Republican	45.77%
Other	5.12%

House seats
Republican	70.00%
Democratic	30.00%

=== By district ===
Results of the 1872 United States House of Representatives elections in Tennessee by district:

District	Incumbent			This race	
District	Member	Party	First elected	Results	Candidates
Tennessee at-large	Horace Maynard; Redistricted from the 2nd district.	Republican	1865	New district. Republican gain.	▌ ✓ Horace Maynard (Republican) 43.95%; ▌Benjamin F. Cheatham (Democratic) 35.45%; ▌Andrew Johnson (Independent) 20.61%
Tennessee 1	Roderick R. Butler	Republican	1867	Incumbent re-elected.	▌ ✓ Roderick R. Butler (Republican) 56.73%; ▌William B. Carter (Democratic) 43.27%
Tennessee 2	Abraham E. Garrett; Redistricted from the 3rd district.	Democratic	1870	Incumbent lost re-election as an Independent. Republican gain.	▌ ✓ Jacob M. Thornburgh (Republican) 55.70%; ▌Alfred Caldwell (Democratic) 30.05%; ▌Abraham E. Garrett (Independent) 14.25%
Tennessee 3	None (new district)			New district. Republican gain.	▌ ✓ William Crutchfield (Republican) 52.85%; ▌David M. Key (Democratic) 47.16%
Tennessee 4	John M. Bright	Democratic	1870	Incumbent re-elected.	▌ ✓ John M. Bright (Democratic) 69.81%; ▌John P. Steele (Republican) 30.19%
Tennessee 5	Edward I. Golladay	Democratic	1870	Incumbent lost re-election. New member elected. Republican gain.	▌ ✓ Horace Harrison (Republican) 42.07%; ▌Edward I. Golladay (Democratic) 34.10%; ▌William B. Brien (Independent) 23.83%
Tennessee 6	Washington C. Whitthorne	Democratic	1870	Incumbent re-elected.	▌ ✓ Washington C. Whitthorne (Democratic) 53.89%; ▌Theodore H. Gibbs (Republican) 40.74%; ▌Jonathan Morris (Independent) 5.37%
Tennessee 7	Robert P. Caldwell	Democratic	1870	Incumbent lost renomination. New member elected. Democratic hold.	▌ ✓ John D. C. Atkins (Democratic) 55.63%; ▌W. W. Murray (Republican) 37.70%; ▌W. E. Travis (Democratic) 6.67%
Tennessee 8	William W. Vaughan	Democratic	1870	Incumbent retired. New member elected. Republican gain.	▌ ✓ David A. Nunn (Republican) 37.90%; ▌A. W. Campbell (Democratic) 29.83%; ▌William P. Caldwell (Democratic) 22.38%; ▌T. H. Bell (Democratic) 9.89%
Tennessee 9	None (new district)			New district. Republican gain.	▌ ✓ Barbour Lewis (Republican) 56.67%; ▌L. C. Haines (Democratic) 43.33%

== Tennessee at-large ==
1872 Tennessee at-large election
Party	Candidate	Votes	%
Republican	Horace Maynard (incumbent)	80,825	43.95%
Democratic	Benjamin F. Cheatham	65,188	35.45%
Independent	Andrew Johnson	37,900	20.61%
Total votes		183,913	100.00%
Republican win (new seat)			

== District 1 ==
1872 Tennessee's 1st congressional district election
Party	Candidate	Votes	%
Republican	Roderick R. Butler (incumbent)	10,289	56.73%
Democratic	William B. Carter	7,849	43.27%
Total votes		18,138	100.00%
Republican hold			

== District 2 ==
1872 Tennessee's 2nd congressional district election
Party	Candidate	Votes	%
Republican	Jacob M. Thornburgh	10,015	55.70%
Democratic	Alfred Caldwell	5,403	30.05%
Independent	Abraham E. Garrett (incumbent)	2,563	14.25%
Total votes		17,981	100.00%
Republican gain from Democratic			

== District 3 ==
1872 Tennessee's 3rd congressional district election
Party	Candidate	Votes	%
Republican	William Crutchfield	10,041	52.85%
Democratic	David M. Key	8,960	47.16%
Total votes		19,001	100.00%
Republican win (new seat)			

== District 4 ==
1872 Tennessee's 4th congressional district election
Party	Candidate	Votes	%
Democratic	John M. Bright (incumbent)	12,585	69.81%
Republican	John P. Steele	5,442	30.19%
Total votes		18,027	100.00%
Republican hold			

== District 5 ==
1872 Tennessee's 5th congressional district election
Party	Candidate	Votes	%
Republican	Horace Harrison	10,033	42.07%
Democratic	Edward I. Golladay (incumbent)	8,131	34.05%
Independent	William B. Brien	5,684	23.83%
Total votes		23,848	100.00%
Republican gain from Democratic			

== District 6 ==
1872 Tennessee's 6th congressional district election
Party	Candidate	Votes	%
Democratic	Washington Curran Whitthorne (incumbent)	9,058	53.89%
Republican	Theodore H. Gibbs	6,849	40.74%
Independent	Jonathan Morris	903	5.37%
Total votes		16,810	100.00%
Democratic hold			

== District 7 ==
1872 Tennessee's 7th congressional district election
Party	Candidate	Votes	%
Democratic	John D. C. Atkins (incumbent)	11,411	55.63%
Republican	W. W. Murray	7,734	37.70%
Democratic	W. E. Travis	1,369	6.67%
Total votes		20,514	100.00%
Democratic hold			

== District 8 ==
1872 Tennessee's 8th congressional district election
Party	Candidate	Votes	%
Republican	David A. Nunn	7,580	37.90%
Democratic	A. W. Campbell	5,967	29.83%
Democratic	William P. Caldwell	4,476	22.38%
Democratic	T. H. Bell	1,979	9.89%
Total votes		20,002	100.00%
Republican gain from Democratic			

== District 9 ==
1872 Tennessee's 9th congressional district election
Party	Candidate	Votes	%
Republican	Barbour Lewis	13,784	56.67%
Democratic	L. C. Haines	10,541	43.33%
Total votes		24,325	100.00%
Republican win (new seat)			

== See also ==
- 1872 United States presidential election in Tennessee
- 1872 Tennessee gubernatorial election
