= Alfred Freeman =

Alfred or Alf Freeman may refer to:

- Tich Freeman (1888–1965), English cricketer for Kent and England
- Alfred Freeman (Essex cricketer) (1892–1972), English cricketer
- Alf Freeman (footballer, born 1904) (1904–1966), English footballer (Lincoln City)
- Alf Freeman (footballer, born 1920) (1920–2006), English footballer (Southampton)
- Alfred A. Freeman (1838–1926), American politician, judge and diplomat
