= Thomas Lemuel James =

American politician

Thomas James
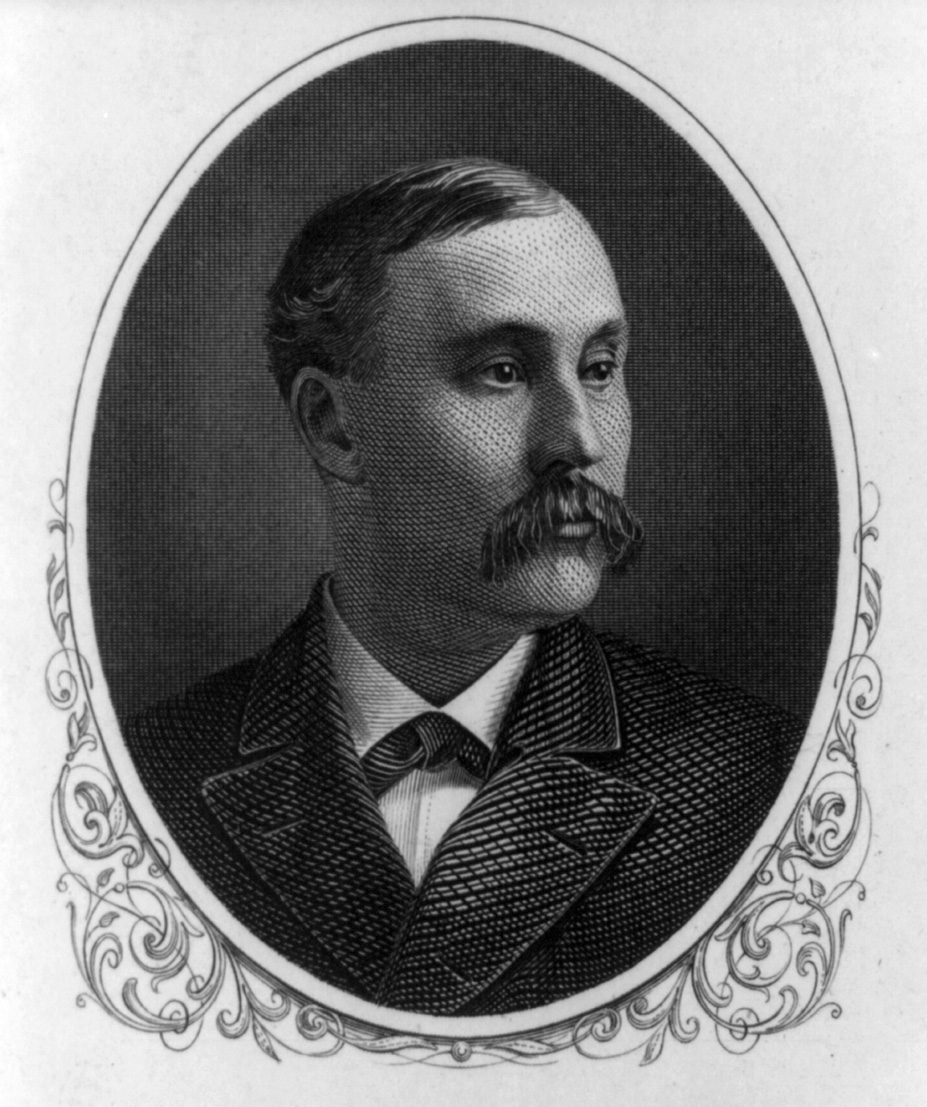

29th United States Postmaster General
- In office March 5, 1881 – December 20, 1881
- President: James A. Garfield; Chester A. Arthur
- Preceded by: Horace Maynard
- Succeeded by: Timothy O. Howe

2nd Mayor of Tenafly, New Jersey
- In office January 1, 1896 – December 31, 1897
- Preceded by: Henry B. Palmer
- Succeeded by: Henry B. Palmer

Personal details
- Born: Thomas Lemuel James; March 29, 1831 Utica, New York, U.S.
- Died: September 11, 1916 (aged 85) New York City, New York, U.S.
- Party: Republican

Thomas Lemuel James (March 29, 1831 – September 11, 1916) was an American journalist, government official, and banker who served as the United States Postmaster General in 1881.

== Early life and family ==
James was born in Utica, New York, to William James and Jane Maria Price. His grandparents on both sides had emigrated from Wales in 1800. He had very little formal schooling, though studied for a short time at the Utica Academy. At the age of 15, James learned the trade of printing at the office of Utica "Liberty Press" under Westley Bailey, a noted abolitionist of the time. The abolition paper printed here later partnered with Francis B. Fisher in Hamilton, New York to form the Whig newspaper Madison County Journal which he bought in 1851. When the Republican party made their first canvass in 1856, the newspaper merged with the Democratic Reflector under the name of the Democratic Republican, which would lead the opposition against the Know Nothing Party.

James married four times, first to Emily Ida Freedburn in 1852, then to E. R. Borden, later to Edith Colborne, and in 1911 to Florence MacDonnell Gaffney.

== Government career ==
For the next ten years, he would continue in the field of journalism while also serving as a canal toll collector in Hamilton from 1854 to 1855. By 1861 he was made an inspector of customs in New York City and promoted three years later to weigher. In 1863 he received the honorary degree of Master of Arts from Hamilton College. James later received honorary LL.D. degrees from Madison College (now Colgate University), the College of St. Francis Xavier in New York City, and St. John's University, also in New York City.

James was appointed to the position of deputy collector in 1870 and put in charge of the warehouse division and bonded warehouses of the port. James had much success in the new position, organizing the records of the division, which had been in confusion, in only a month, and bringing the work up to date, which had been up to three years behind, in only six months. Afterwards, he was appointed by Chester A. Arthur, then Collector of the Port of New York, to be a member of the civil service board of the collector's and surveyor's offices and made its chairman. He became one of the first public officials to advocate for the reform of civil service by appointing positions on the basis of examination and merit.

James urged President Grant to allow him to succeed Alonzo B. Cornell as Surveyor of the Port. Grant instead did one better and made him the Postmaster of New York City on March 17, 1873, and four years later reappointed by President Hayes. James instituted several reforms during his terms, including increasing the efficiency of the postal workforce and improving postal facilities wherever possible. Once General Arthur stepped down, James was offered the position but turned it down as he did not feel it right to supersede his superior. However, David M. Key resigned as Postmaster General in 1880, and James was offered that position by Hayes instead. After consulting with his friends, he declined it as well. He was asked to be the Republican nominee for mayor of New York the same year but turned this down also.

=== United States Postmaster General ===
On March 5, 1881, President Garfield announced his new cabinet, which included James as Postmaster General. Stepping down from his previous position as Postmaster of New York (which was to be succeeded by his son-in-law), he entered into office two days later. In only ten months he enacted lasting reforms. When he first took office, he found an annual deficit of $2 million, varying in amounts with few exceptions going back to 1851. He immediately began a policy of reform, making reductions in the star service amounting to $1,713,541, and in the steamboat service saving over $300,000, and thus clearing the debt. Moreover, he cooperated with the Department of Justice to undertake a thorough investigation of abuses and frauds within his department. The end result of this was the famous Star routes trials. In giving his annual report to Congress, he declared that his reforms would allow for a two or three-cent reduction in postage, which was enacted shortly thereafter. He also set up a convention of money ordering with Jamaica and the Australian colonies. However shortly after with the assassination of Garfield and Arthur becoming president, the entire cabinet would have been shuffled, and James decided to resign in December of the same year and withdrew from politics altogether.

== Later life ==
He later became president of the Lincoln National Bank in 1882, as well as the Lincoln Safe-deposit Company of New York., and serving on their board of directors until his death. James moved to Tenafly, New Jersey in 1885. By 1896 he again entered politics, serving as the mayor of Tenafly. He died in New York City, and is interred at the Church of the Heavenly Rest in Manhattan.

James was one of the founders and the first "Grand Monarch" of the Mystic Order of Veiled Prophets of the Enchanted Realm, an appendant body in Freemasonry.

Political offices
Preceded by Horace Maynard	United States Postmaster General; Served under: James A. Garfield, Chester A. Arthur; 1881	Succeeded by Timothy O. Howe
