= Laura Thornburgh =

First film editor for the US govt, author

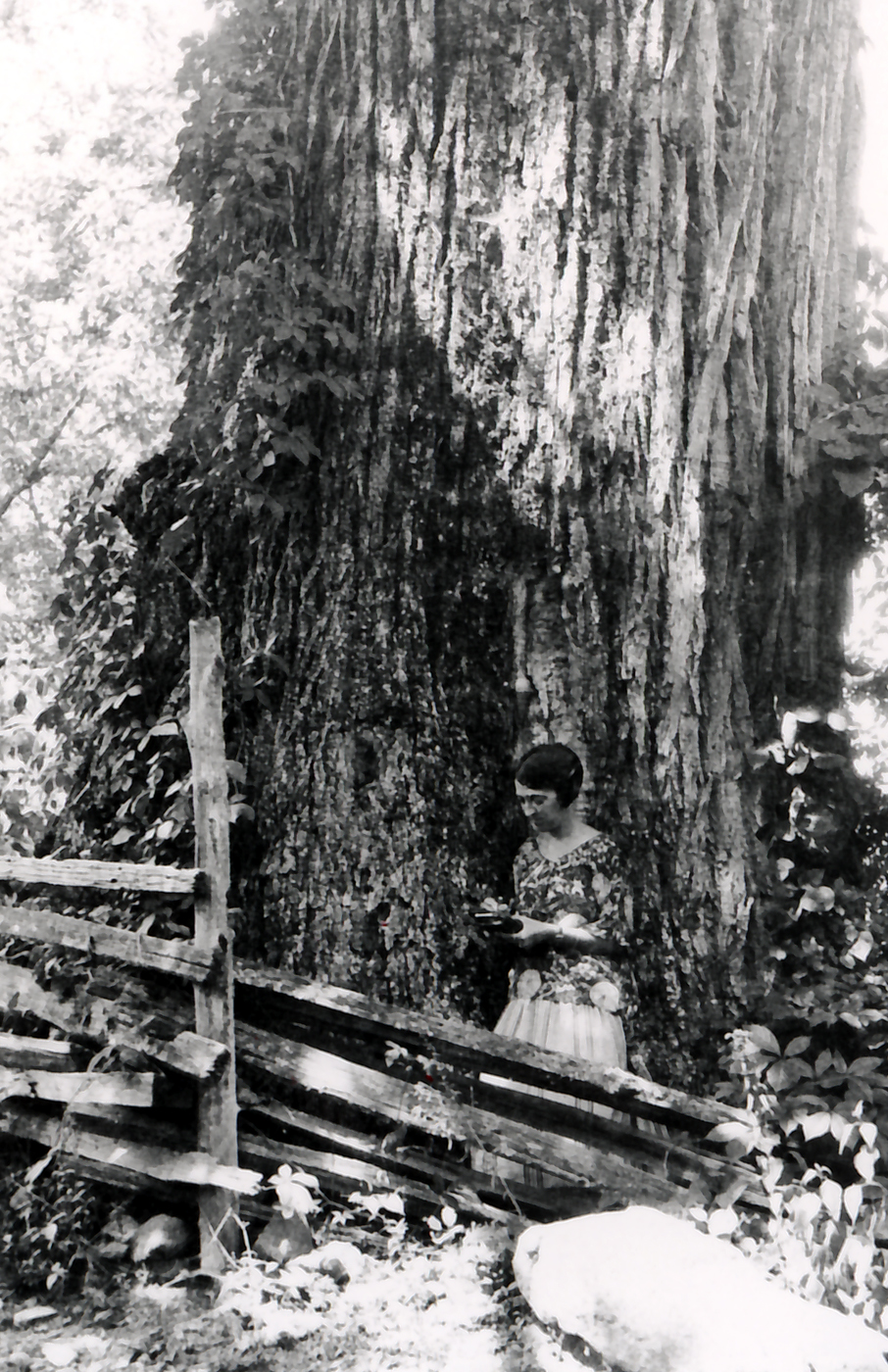
- Laura Thornburgh in a self-portrait.
- Born: February 8, 1885; Knoxville, Tennessee, U.S.
- Died: March 28, 1973 (aged 88); Chattanooga, Tennessee
- Resting place: Old Gray Cemetery, Knoxville, Tennessee
- Occupations: Author; Journalist; Photographer; Film Editor; Film Director
- Employer(s): Knoxville News Sentinel, The Knoxville Journal
- Parents: Jacob Montgomery Thornburgh (father); Laura Emma (Pettibone) Thornburgh (mother)
- Writing career
- Pen name: Laura Thornborough (based on an Old English spelling)
- Language: American English
- Years active: From 1902
- Genres: Non-fiction
- Subjects: Great Smoky Mountains National Park, Motion Pictures, Interior Decorating, Etiquette
- Notable works: The Great Smoky Mountains (1937), Motion Pictures in Education (1923)

Laura Thornburgh (February 8, 1885 – March 28, 1973) was an American author, journalist, photographer, director, and film editor who was best known for her 1937 guidebook to Great Smoky Mountains National Park, published under the pen name Laura Thornborough. Her landmark publication Motion Pictures in Education popularized the usage of audiovisual aids in the classroom. As part of the World War I war effort, Thornburgh joined the United States Department of Agriculture film department under the supervision of Don Carlos Ellis as a scenario editor, making her an early film editor for the United States Government.

== Biography ==
=== Early life ===
Thornburgh was born to Jacob Montgomery and Laura Emma (née Pettibone) Thornburgh in Knoxville, Tennessee. She had two siblings: local attorney John M. Thornburgh and sister Elizabeth T. Sullivan. Her father, Jacob, was a Civil War veteran. During the war, he fled to Kentucky to enlist in the Union army. After a celebrated military career, Thornburgh declined a major's commission in the army and returned to Jefferson County to practice law with Confederate Robert McFarland, later moving to Knoxville in 1866. In 1872, he was elected to Congress and served three consecutive terms. His health became impaired towards the end of his career and he returned to Knoxville to practice law.

After years of ill health, Jacob died when Laura was relatively young. Her childhood interests were likely shaped in large part by her mother, a devout Catholic and charter member of the Catholic literary group known as The Newman Circle. Her mother had ancestral ties to the American Revolution as a descendant of John Morton. Laura's maternal grandparents lived on a farm that was where the Department of Agriculture now stands, and where Laura Thornburgh would later work as a film editor.

Laura Thornburgh was an avid reader and a talented student at the Knoxville Girls' School as well as the University of Tennessee, likely due to good influence from her parents’ love for the library. Her father Jacob donated a large number of books to bolster the collection of the new Lawson McGhee Library in 1889. Laura Thornburgh celebrated the library and was known for reading voraciously. According to a 1940 interview, Thornburgh was greatly influenced by Louisa May Alcott’s Little Women: “I realized then that one’s own life or the everyday life about you is material for a book. The determination borne then never left me.”

Her goal of writing led to a position at the Knoxville News Sentinel before she graduated college as she was hired to cover the Summer School in 1902. Later, Thornburgh became society editor and drama critic, interviewing visiting artists, actors, and musicians for the paper. Articles of Thornburgh's were regularly published in the Knoxville newspapers throughout her career. She was an early member of Knoxville’s Pi chapter of the national sorority Chi Omega, and her connections with her sorority sisters would be a major influence on her life and writing. She later attended Columbia University as well as the University of Geneva in Switzerland and George Washington University.

=== Career in educational film ===
Writing and women's clubs were Thornburgh's main passions in the 1910s, but things changed as America entered World War I. She became the chairman of the local book campaign for soldiers with the local Association of College Women. Eventually, she was called to serve her country in a new and emerging field: motion pictures. Thornburgh was hired by Don Carlos Ellis, with whom she would later author her landmark publication Motion Pictures in Education.

Educational film by the USDA to show how forest fires affect wildlife habitats. Laura Thornbugh is credited as editor.

The United States Department of Agriculture's (USDA) Motion Picture Division focused on creating educational films for the American public as one of the earliest official motion picture units for the United States Government. Thornburgh joined as Scenario Editor, making her an early film editor for the United States Government. Laura Thornburgh edited over 30,000 feet worth of film in just eight months while working for the USDA. It is unknown exactly how many films she worked on; the National Archives and Records Administration (NARA) has her name associated with 59 records available through their online database.

In 1920, both Thornburgh and Ellis were hired by the Harry Levey Company and National Non-Theatrical Motion Pictures, Inc. to briefly work on educational films. When she and Ellis moved to New York City, she likely became frustrated with the lack of easy distribution to classrooms and communities across the nation, and began to realize that the films they were working on were not being used to their fullest ability. Thornburgh published a notice in trade magazines that her company was seeking to build a national film library to strengthen the availability of educational film. She attended Columbia’s first course in motion picture visual instruction and became inspired to write a book.

Realizing that a publication of best practices was necessary, she and Ellis resigned their positions to co-author Motion Pictures in Education in 1923, coinciding with the introduction of 16mm film, which was perfect for school use. This book became a landmark publication in the field of audiovisual education as it not only gave guidelines for how best to implement these films, but also how to refute arguments against the use of film from cautious administrators or wary parents. Thornburgh was hired to give lectures on the use of film for education thanks to the success of this book. She taught a course at Columbia as well as University of Tennessee's Summer School, and became the national chairman of motion pictures for the journalist organization National League of American Pen Women.

Although she spent her summers in East Tennessee, she spent the winters with her sister Elizabeth in Washington, where she returned to editing films for the United States Government with the Signal Corps to supplement her income until at least 1936.

=== The Great Smoky Mountains (1937) ===
Growing up in East Tennessee, Thornburgh had a long-standing appreciation for the beautiful Great Smoky Mountains near her hometown. When she returned to Knoxville after the publication of her book on motion pictures, her focus returned to the mountains as the movement built to create a new national park. Thornburgh eventually purchased land in Gatlinburg and built a cabin known fondly as Thorn Borough Cottage. She and her mother lived in the cabin the summers and would stay with Jacob Thornburgh in the city for the winter.

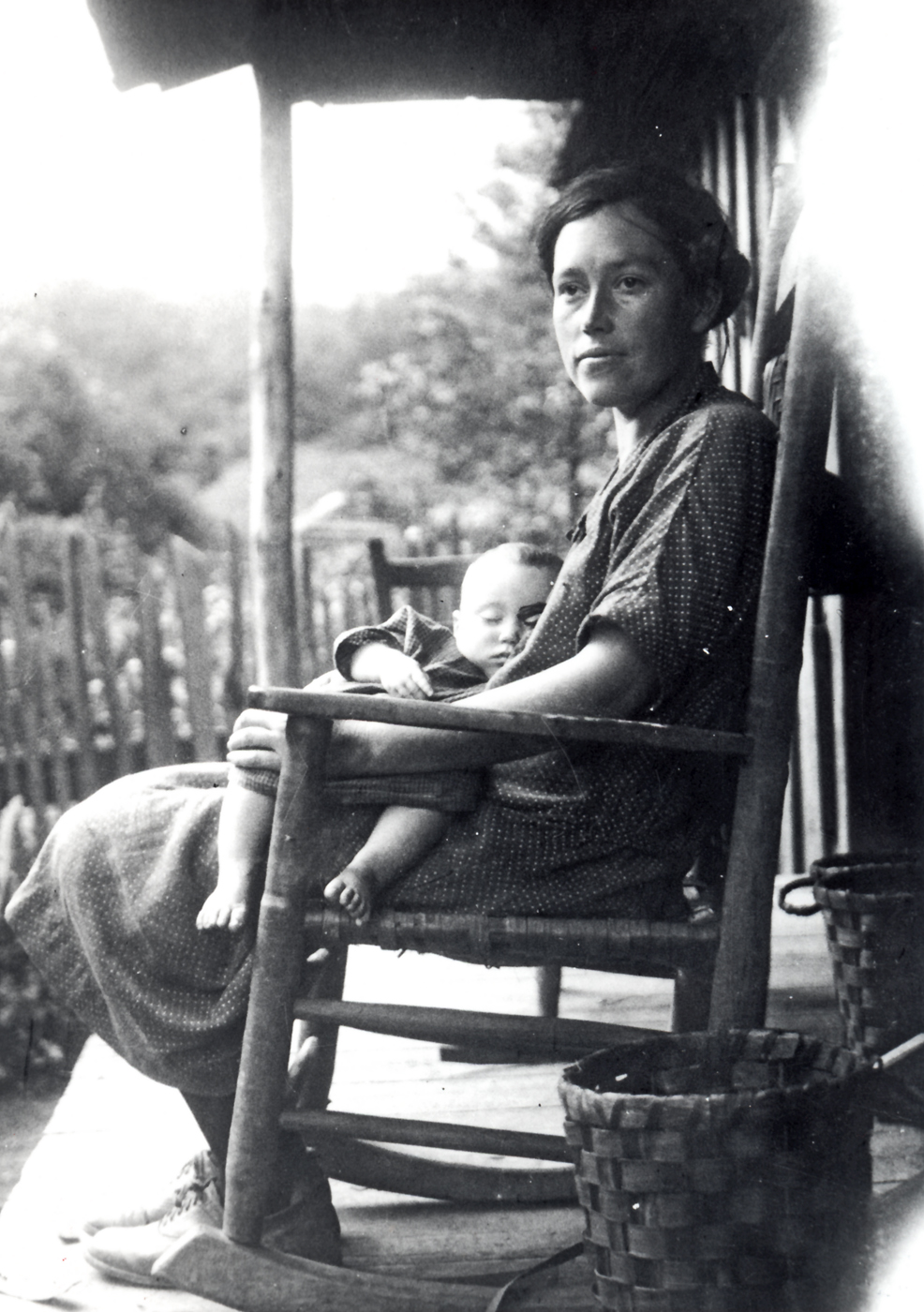
Molly McCarter Ogle rocks her daughter Mattie on the porch. This photo has become one of the most famous images created of mountain people in the Smokies. Photo taken by Laura Thornburgh in 1928.

Thornburgh became a member of the Smoky Mountains Hiking Club and hiked with Knoxville photographer Jim Thompson to document the Smokies. A contrast to Thompson's landscape photographs, Thornburgh focused on capturing portraits of the locals, including well-known guide Wiley Oakley. In 1925, Laura was part of the hiking party with the special commission to inspect the mountains as a new park, along with Assistant Director of the National Park Service Arno B. Cammerer.

Wanting to document the life and culture of the Appalachian people, Thornburgh wrote articles for magazines such as American Forests and Forest Life as well as Travel. These articles were well-received and Thornburgh became inspired to pursue the publication of a book. Initially taking inspiration from Little Women, her first draft was a more fictional account of young couples exploring the Smokies. After failing to find a publisher, she reshaped the manuscript into a more traditional guidebook.

The book was an instant success and sold out in just 30 days. It was the first guidebook to the Smokies written by a woman and had valuable insight into mountain culture as well as information on the best hikes. The book cemented her status as an authority on the Smokies; she was regularly hired to speak on the topic of the Smokies and the book would be reprinted several times, the latest edition released in 1971.

=== Personal life ===
Laura Thornburgh never married. The success of The Great Smoky Mountains meant that Thornburgh did not have to return to film editing, but she continued to stay interested in the use of motion pictures for education as well as encouraging fellow female writers to become scenario editors and work in the motion picture industry. She regularly appeared on radio like WROL or WNOX.

Thornburgh spent her days in her beloved Gatlinburg cottage, where she lived with her mother. She was a devout Catholic and was a leader in organizing St. Mary’s Catholic Church in Gatlinburg. She was once an officer in the National Council of Catholic Women and did important work in the East Tennessee Deanery. She took care of her elderly mother until her mother’s death in 1948 at age 93.

She regularly hosted visitors and guests in Gatlinburg, including entomologist François Vaillant, who would later name an insect he discovered there in her honor. She wrote articles on local news for The Gatlinburg Press.

She was involved in many women's organizations and activities, including the National League of American Pen Women, Ossoli Circle, Bridge Club, Southern Association of College Women, Blount Literary Society, Nicholson Art League, Newman Circle, Press Club, and countless others.

=== Death and legacy ===
Laura Thornburgh died at Memorial Hospital in Chattanooga, Tennessee, March 28, 1973. Her obituary celebrated how her books brought visitors to the national park and made the nation aware of the beauty of the Smokies. Representative John Mann honored her with House Joint Resolution No. 170, celebrating her as “a writer who did much toward publishing the beauty of Tennessee.”

As Marina Dahlquist and Joel Frykholm stated in their 2019 book The Institutionalization of Educational Cinema, Motion Pictures in Education was the deciding factor in the implementation of film as a medium for learning in the American classroom:

Only Motion Pictures in Education could readily be seen as an attempt to push educational cinema down the institutional path of medium specificity and regulated meaning production, in that Ellis and Thornborough set out to codify best practices for the production and teaching of the classroom film as an autonomous and pedagogically legitimate genre.

— Marina Dahlquist and Joel Frykholm, The Institutionalization of Educational Cinema

== Bibliography ==
- Motion Pictures in Education (1923)
- Etiquette for everybody: a guide to social usage for old and young (1923)
- The Etiquette of Letter Writing (1924)
- Interior decorating for everybody (1925)
- The Psychologist Keeps House (1930)
- The Great Smoky Mountains (1937)

== Partial filmography ==
Please see the National Archives online catalog for records associated with Laura Thornburgh.

- American Home Canning in France (1919)
- Winged Guardians of the Forest (1919)
- Outdoor Life in the Rockies (1920)
- Grain Dust Explosions (1921)
- Bees—How They Live and Work (1921)
- The Porcelain Lamp (1922) (lost film made for the Harry Levey Company)
- Forest Fires or Game? (1931)
- The Realm of the Honeybee (1932) — Director
- Historic Scenes Along the Mount Vernon Memorial Highway (1933) — Director
- Building the Mount Vernon Memorial Highway (1933) — Director
