= James E. Bailey =

American politician (1822–1885)

James Edmund Bailey
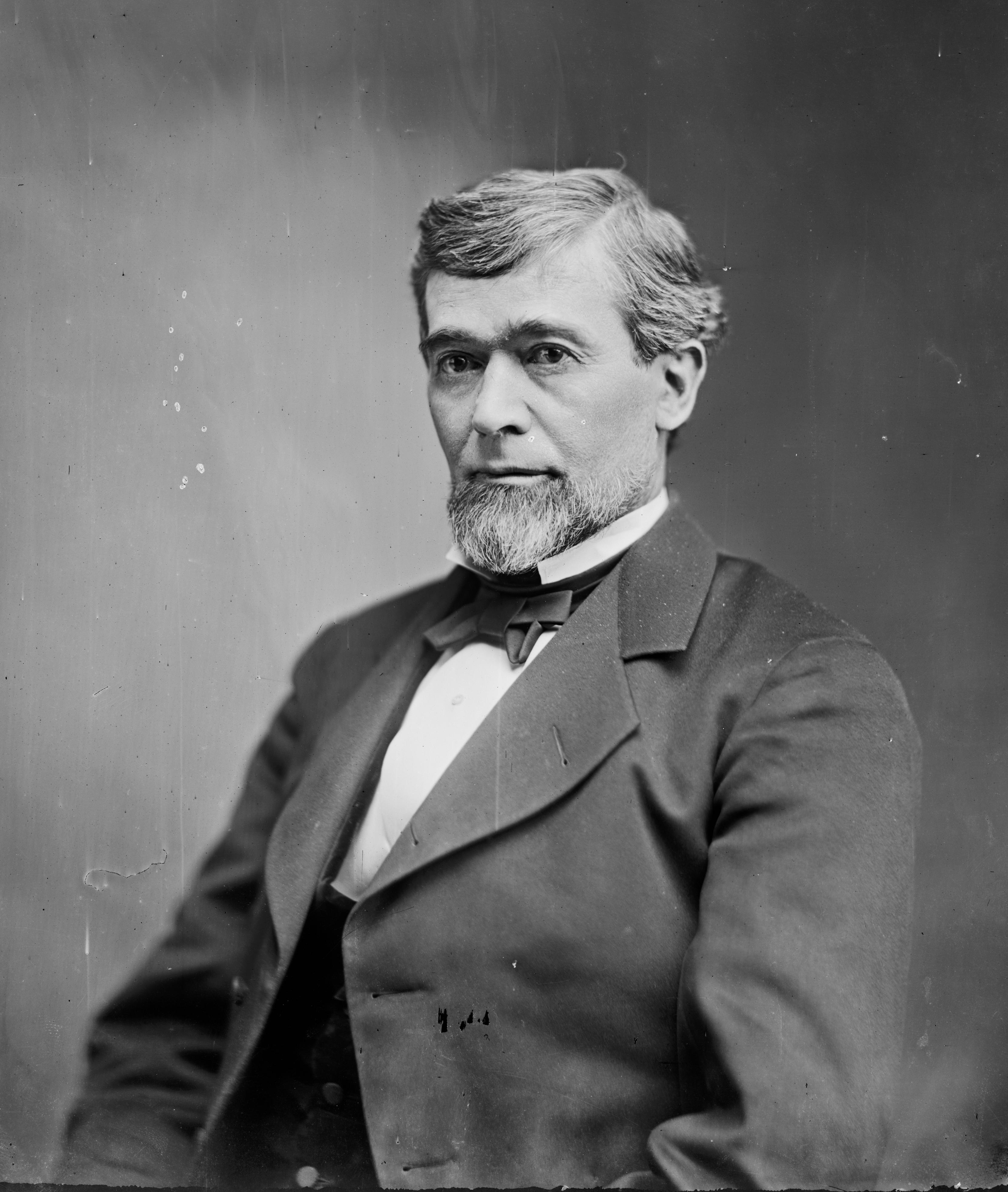

United States Senator from Tennessee
- In office January 19, 1877 – March 3, 1881
- Preceded by: David M. Key
- Succeeded by: Howell E. Jackson

Member of the Tennessee House of Representatives
- In office 1853

Personal details
- Born: August 15, 1822 Montgomery County, Tennessee
- Died: December 29, 1885 (aged 63) Clarksville, Tennessee
- Party: Democratic

James Edmund Bailey (August 15, 1822 – December 29, 1885) was an American Democratic United States Senator from Tennessee from 1877 to 1881.

== Early life and education ==
Bailey was born in Montgomery County, Tennessee. He attended the Clarksville Academy and the former University of Nashville.

== Career ==
He then studied law and was admitted to the bar in 1843, starting a practice in Clarksville, Tennessee. In 1853, he was elected to the Tennessee House of Representatives as a Whig.

During the Civil War, he served in the 49th Tennessee Regiment, Confederate States Army as a colonel.

He was appointed by governor of Tennessee John C. Brown to the Court of Arbitration in 1874.

Bailey was elected by the Tennessee General Assembly as a Democrat to the balance of the unexpired term of the late Andrew Johnson, serving from January 19, 1877, to March 4, 1881. In the 46th Congress, he was chairman of the Senate Committee on Education and Labor. His efforts to effect his reelection were unsuccessful, and upon the expiry of his term he returned to the practice of law in Clarksville.

== Family ==
Bailey's son was Judge Jennings Bailey.

== Death ==
He died in Clarksville and is buried in that city's Greenwood Cemetery.

U.S. Senate
Preceded by David M. Key	U.S. senator (Class 1) from Tennessee; 1877–1881; Served alongside: Isham G. Harris	Succeeded by Howell E. Jackson
