= Charles Dickens Clark =

American judge (1847–1908)

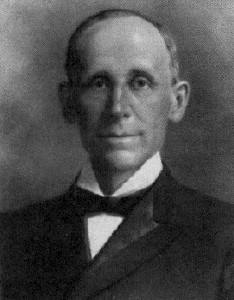

Judge of the United States District Court for the Eastern District of Tennessee Judge of the United States District Court for the Middle District of Tennessee
- In office January 21, 1895 – March 15, 1908
- Appointed by: Grover Cleveland
- Preceded by: David M. Key
- Succeeded by: Edward Terry Sanford

Personal details
- Born: October 7, 1847 Laurel Cove, Tennessee, U.S.
- Died: March 15, 1908 (aged 60) Chattanooga, Tennessee, U.S.
- Education: Burritt College (B.A.); Cumberland School of Law (LL.B.)

Charles Dickens Clark (October 7, 1847 – March 15, 1908) was a United States district judge of the United States District Court for the Eastern District of Tennessee and the United States District Court for the Middle District of Tennessee.

== Education and career ==
Born in Laurel Cove, an unincorporated community in Van Buren County, Tennessee, Clark received a Bachelor of Arts degree from Burritt College in 1871 and a Bachelor of Laws from Cumberland School of Law (then part of Cumberland University, now part of Samford University) in 1873. He was on the staff of Confederate States General George G. Dibrell in Richmond, Virginia from 1864 to 1865. He was in private practice in Manchester, Tennessee from 1876 to 1883, and in Chattanooga, Tennessee from 1883 to 1895.

== Federal judicial service ==
Clark was nominated by President Grover Cleveland on December 17, 1894, to a joint seat on the United States District Court for the Eastern District of Tennessee and the United States District Court for the Middle District of Tennessee vacated by Judge David M. Key. He was confirmed by the United States Senate on January 21, 1895, and received his commission the same day. His service terminated on March 15, 1908, due to his death in Chattanooga.

== Sources ==
Legal offices
Preceded by David M. Key	Judge of the United States District Court for the Eastern District of Tennessee; Judge of the United States District Court for the Middle District of Tennessee; 1895–1908	Succeeded by Edward Terry Sanford
