= Motion Pictures in Education =

1923 book by Laura Thornburgh

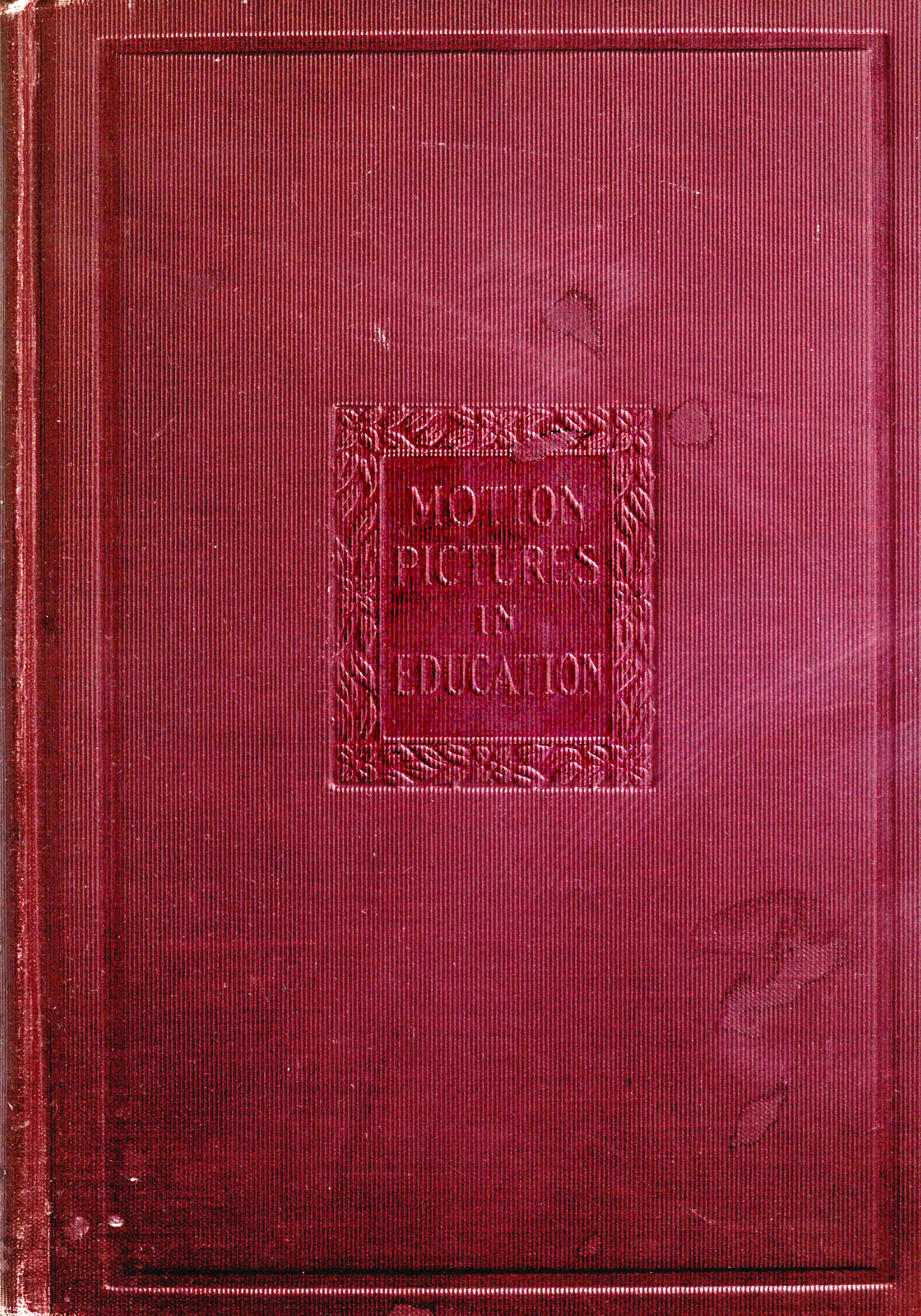
- Authors: Laura Thornburgh and Don Carlos Ellis
- Language: English
- Publisher: Thomas Y. Crowell Co.
- Publication date: 1923
- Publication place: United States
- Pages: 284

Motion Pictures in Education: A Practical Handbook for Users of Visual Aids is a 1923 non-fiction book by Laura Thornburgh, under the pen name Laura Thornborough, and Don Carlos Ellis, as an early work focusing on using films in classrooms. Scholars believe that the book is among the first major works about using films to teach students. Thomas Y. Crowell Co. published the book in 1923.

== Synopsis ==
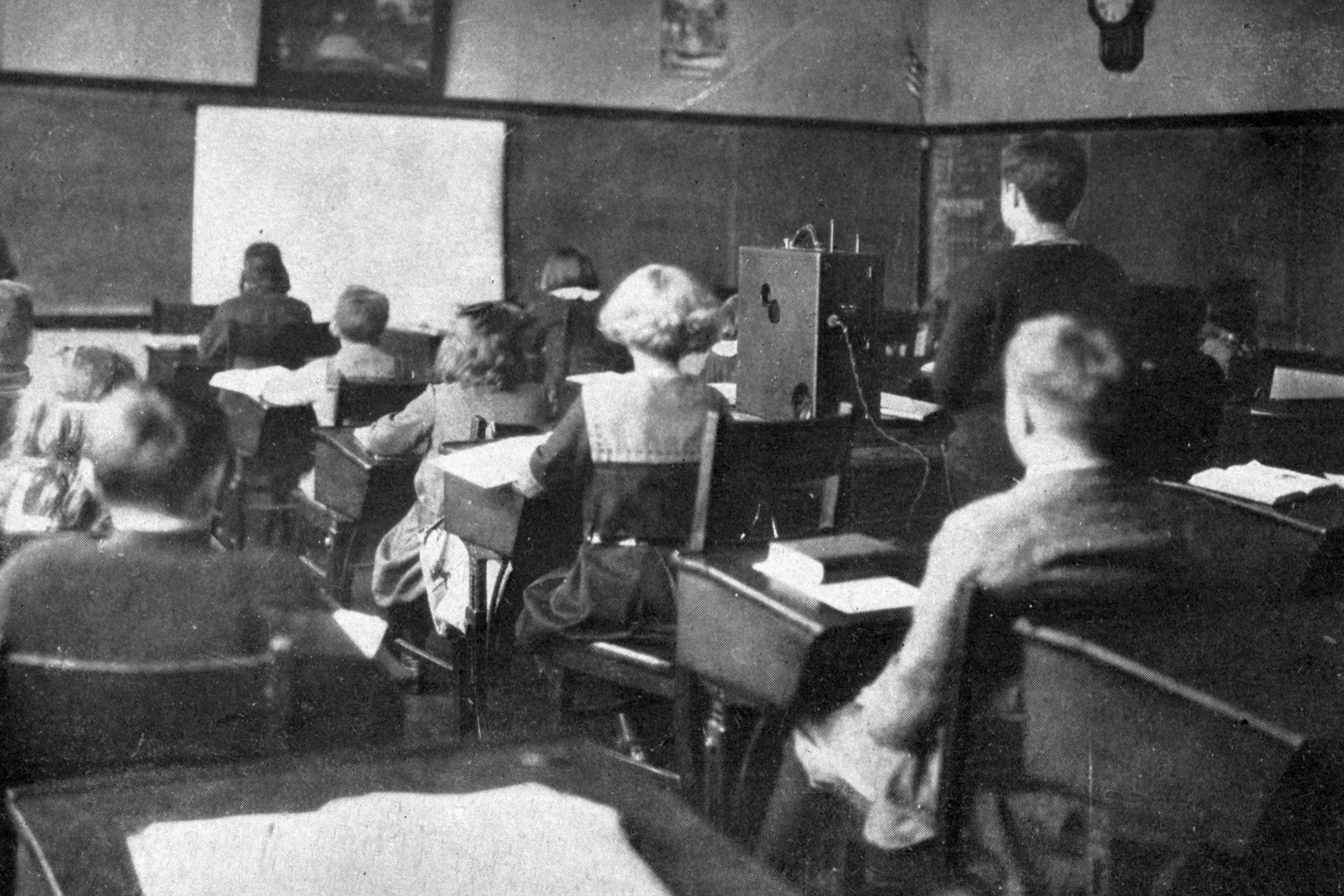
A student of the State Street School (Hackensack, New Jersey) helping to project an educational film c. 1923, as photographed for the book

The book opens with an introduction by Philander Claxton, former U.S. Commissioner of Education, on using films to teach. It shows how teachers can instruct students by using a film projector, combined with typical methods, while detailing how to choose the needed films and equipment. The book contains the history of moving pictures up to the early 1920s, starting with horse pictures by Eadweard Muybridge that were moved quickly to imitate movement. It mentions how films were initially meant for education, but that they quickly became produced for profit. 125 film distributors are listed, including the government and state universities, to obtain films for classroom use. It is noted that film distribution to institutions with a low profit margin typically did not happen, including schools. The authors thought some films should only be created for such institutions, but they did not want Hollywood or the government to produce such films. 17 objections to films being used for teaching are listed which includes dulling imagination, causing eye strain, being a fire hazard (due to the use of nitrocellulose in non-amateur film gauges before 1951), and replacing traditional instruction.

== Impact ==
The Austin American-Statesman said in 1923 that the book is "well-written" and "contains a wealth of information relating to educational films". The Journal and Tribune wrote in 1923 that it has "limitless possibilities for the use of the moving pictures in the school room" and that it was "the first real authoritative work on the subject". Grant Smith of The Chicago Schools Journal wrote in 1924 that the "whole book is a serious and valuable effort". Much of the 17 objections about films in classrooms were proven false by 1933, with one of the remaining objections being that there are uncertain benefits.
