= 1872 United States presidential election in Tennessee =

- November 5, 1872
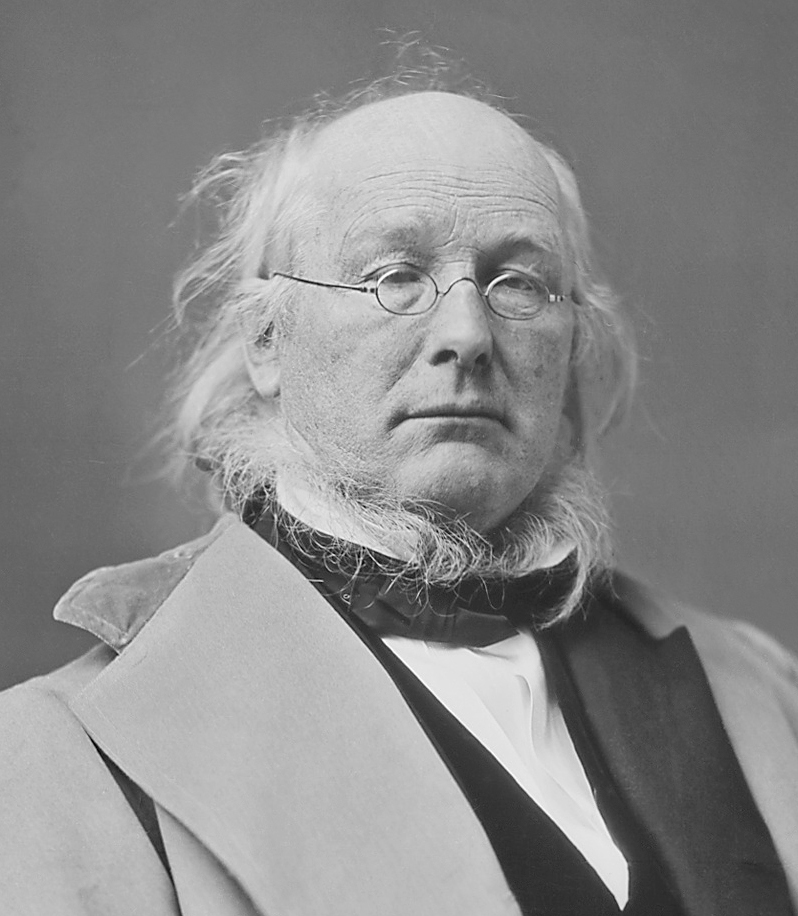

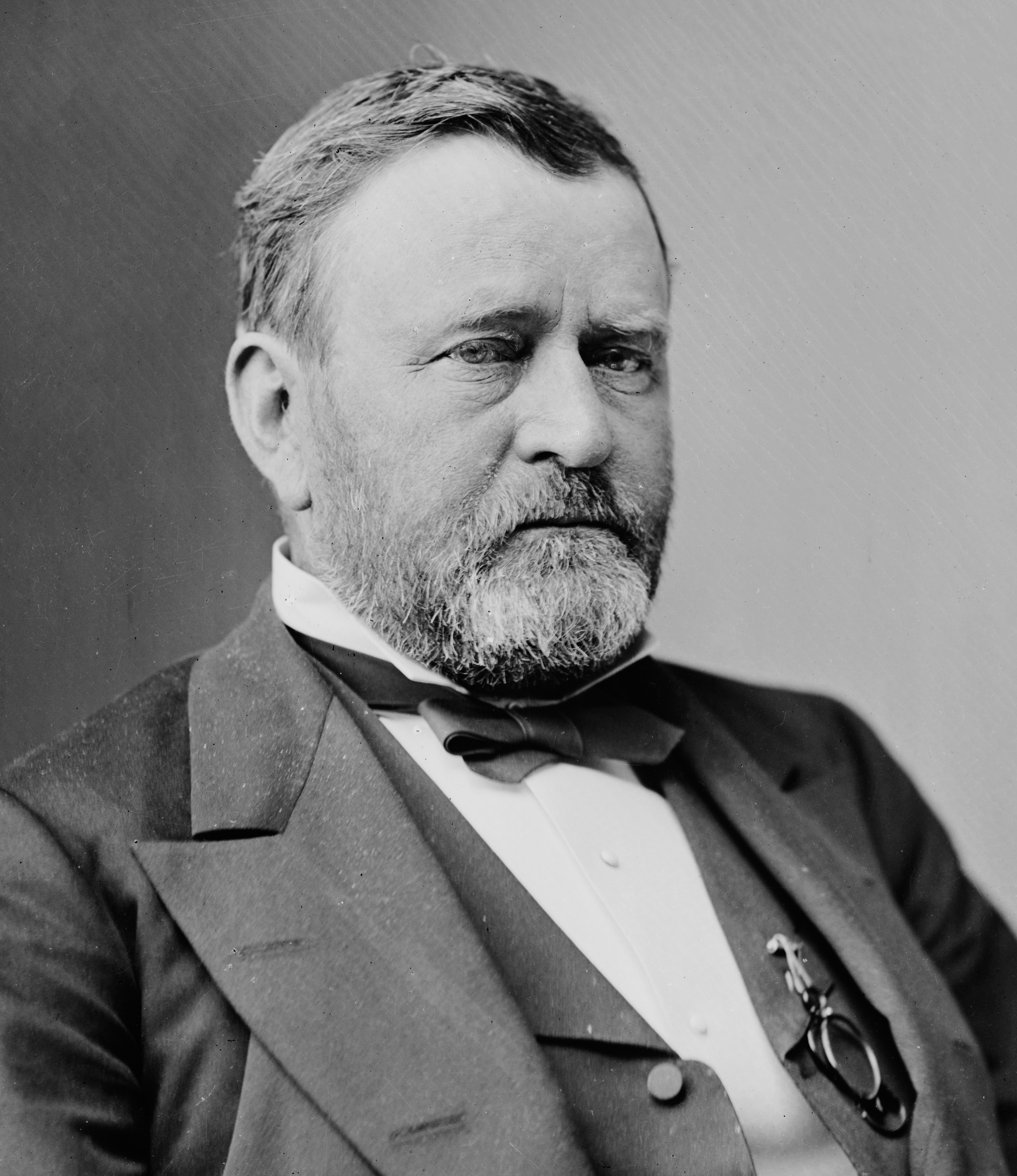
Nominee	Horace Greeley	Ulysses S. Grant
Party	Liberal Republican	Republican
Home state	New York	Ohio
Running mate	Benjamin G. Brown	Henry Wilson
Popular vote	93,391	85,655
Percentage	52.16%	47.84%
County results
Greeley
50–60%
60–70%
70–80%
80–90%
90–100%
Grant
50–60%
60–70%
70–80%
80–90%
90–100%
Unknown/No Vote
President before election
Ulysses S. Grant
Republican
Elected President
Ulysses S. Grant
Republican
- Electoral College vote
- December 17, 1872

12 members of the Electoral College from Tennessee
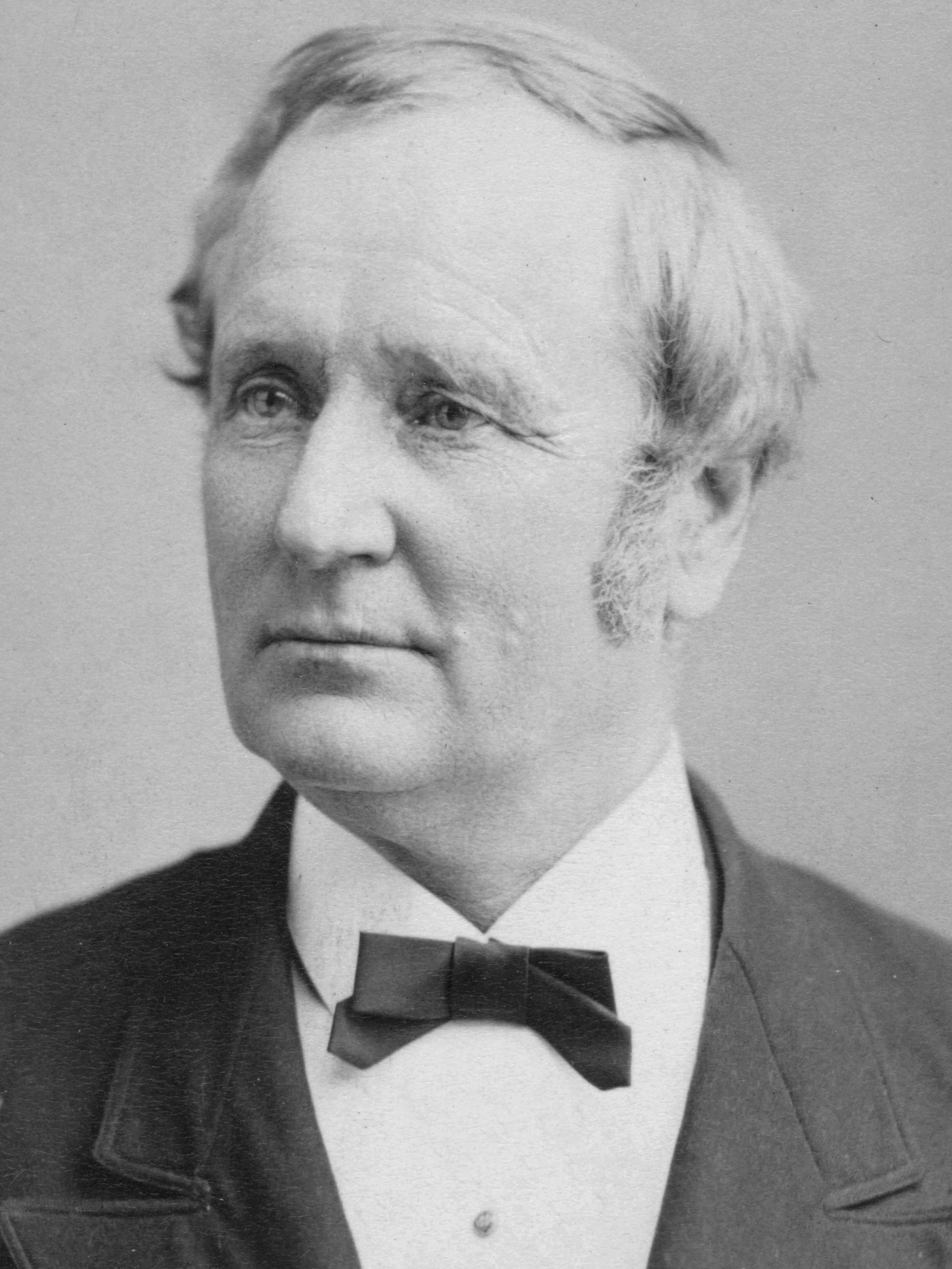
Candidate	Thomas A. Hendricks
Party	Democratic
Home state	Indiana
Running mate	B. Gratz Brown
Electoral vote	12

The 1872 United States presidential election in Tennessee took place on November 5, 1872, as part of the 1872 United States presidential election. Voters chose 12 representatives, or electors to the Electoral College, who voted for president and vice president.

Tennessee voted for the Liberal Republican candidate, Horace Greeley, over Republican candidate, Ulysses S. Grant. Greeley won Tennessee by a narrow margin of 4.32%. However, Greeley died prior to the Electoral College meeting, allowing for Tennessee's twelve electors to vote for the candidate of their choice.

== Results ==
1872 United States presidential election in Tennessee
Party	Candidate	Running mate	Popular vote		Electoral vote	
Party	Candidate	Running mate	Count	%	Count	%
Democratic	Thomas A. Hendricks of Indiana	N/A of N/A	–	–	12	100.00%
Liberal Republican	Horace Greeley of New York	Benjamin Gratz Brown of Missouri	93,391	52.16%	0 (Note: Greeley died after the election, but prior to the Electoral College meeting, and was thus ineligible for the office of President. Greeley had won 12 pledged electors, of which all cast their votes for other Democrats.)	0.00%
Republican	Ulysses S. Grant of Illinois	Henry Wilson of Massachusetts	85,655	47.84%	0	0.00%
Total			179,046	100.00%	12	100.00%

== See also ==
- United States presidential elections in Tennessee
- 1872 United States House of Representatives elections in Tennessee
- 1872 Tennessee gubernatorial election
