= 1872 Tennessee gubernatorial election =

- November 2, 1872
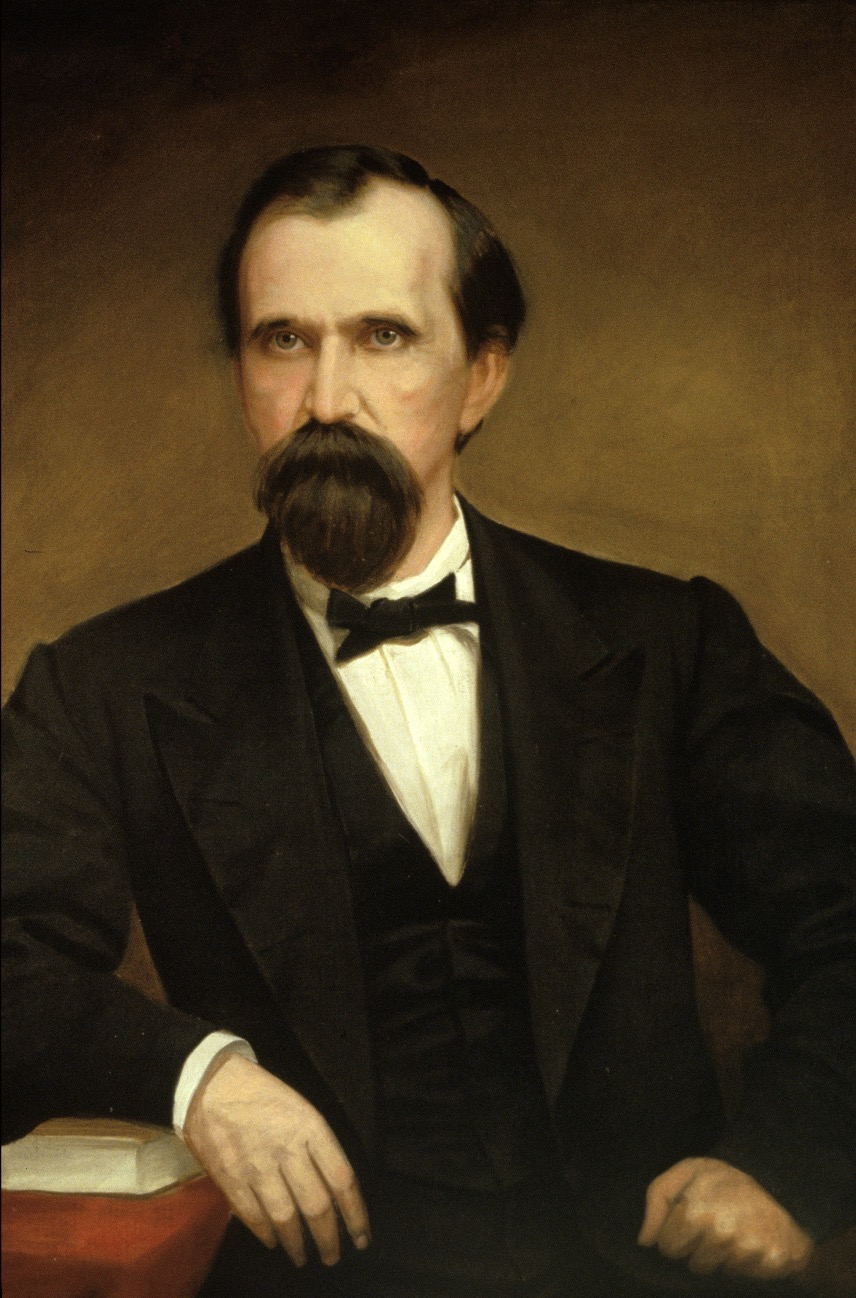

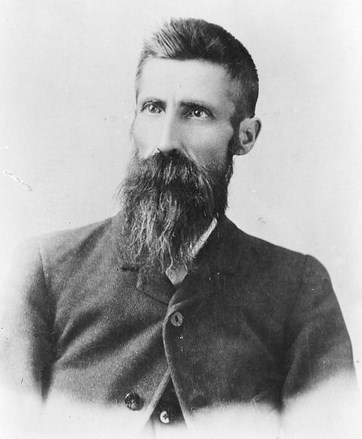
Nominee	John C. Brown	Alfred A. Freeman
Party	Democratic	Republican
Popular vote	97,700	84,089
Percentage	53.74%	46.26%
- County results Brown: 50–60% 60–70% 70–80% 80–90% >90% Freeman: 50–60% 60–70% 70–80% 80–90% >90% No data
Governor before election
John C. Brown
Democratic
Elected Governor
John C. Brown
Democratic

The 1872 Tennessee gubernatorial election was held on November 2, 1872, to elect the governor of Tennessee. Incumbent Democratic governor John C. Brown won re-election, defeating Republican candidate Alfred A. Freeman with 53.74% of the vote.

== Campaign ==
In September 1872, Alfred A. Freeman was nominated as the Republican Party candidate for governor. He spent September and October of that year campaigning and debating the Democratic Party incumbent, former Confederate general John C. Brown. At a debate in Lebanon, Governor Brown blamed the state's growing debt crisis on Republicans, specifically the Brownlow administration. He opposed fixing the debt or funding public schools with tax increases. He blasted the administration of President Ulysses S. Grant as corrupt. In response, Freeman blamed the debt on pre-war Democratic governors, and argued that debts incurred under Brownlow were to rebuild railroads destroyed during the war. He supported a tax to fund public schools, and accused Democrats of stealing the state's school fund when they fled Nashville in early 1862.

On election day, Brown defeated Freeman, 97,700 votes to 84,089 votes.

== General election ==
1872 Tennessee gubernatorial election
Party	Candidate	Votes	%	±%
Democratic	John C. Brown (incumbent)	97,700	53.74	
Republican	Alfred A. Freeman	84,089	46.26	
Total votes		181,789	100.00	

== See also ==
- 1872 United States presidential election in Tennessee
- 1872 United States House of Representatives elections in Tennessee
