= Horace Maynard =

American politician (1814–1882)

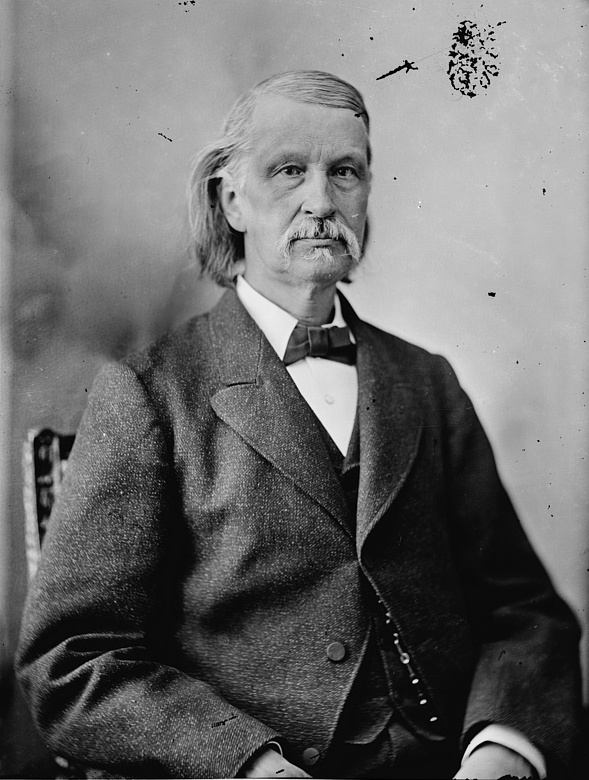
- Maynard, 1870–1880

28th United States Postmaster General
- In office June 2, 1880 – March 4, 1881
- President: Rutherford B. Hayes
- Preceded by: David M. Key
- Succeeded by: Thomas James

United States Minister to the Ottoman Empire
- In office June 12, 1875 – July 15, 1880
- President: Ulysses S. Grant; Rutherford B. Hayes
- Preceded by: George Boker
- Succeeded by: James Longstreet

Chairman of the House Republican Conference
- In office March 4, 1873 – March 3, 1875
- Speaker: James G. Blaine
- Preceded by: Austin Blair
- Succeeded by: George W. McCrary

Member of the U.S. House of Representatives from Tennessee
- In office July 24, 1866 – March 3, 1875
- Preceded by: Self (1863)
- Succeeded by: Jacob M. Thornburgh (2nd)
- Constituency: 2nd district (1866–1873); At-large district (1873–1875)
- In office March 4, 1857 – March 3, 1863
- Preceded by: William H. Sneed (6th)
- Succeeded by: Self (1866)
- Constituency: 2nd district

Personal details
- Born: August 30, 1814 Westborough, Massachusetts, U.S.
- Died: May 3, 1882 (aged 67) Knoxville, Tennessee, U.S.
- Resting place: Old Gray Cemetery
- Party: Whig (Until 1856); American (1856–1858); Opposition (1858–1860); Unionist (1861–1864); Unconditional Union (1864–1867); Republican (1867–1882)
- Spouse: Laura Washburn
- Relatives: Martha Tracy Owler (niece)
- Education: Amherst College (BA)

Horace Maynard (August 30, 1814 – May 3, 1882) was an American educator, attorney, politician and diplomat active primarily in the second half of the 19th century. Initially elected to the House of Representatives from Tennessee's 2nd Congressional District for the term commencing on March 4, 1857, Maynard, an ardent Union supporter and abolitionist, became one of the few Southern congressmen to maintain his seat in the House during the Civil War. Toward the end of the war, Maynard served as Tennessee's attorney general under Governor Andrew Johnson, and later served as ambassador to the Ottoman Empire under President Ulysses S. Grant and Postmaster General under President Rutherford B. Hayes.

Maynard left his teaching position at East Tennessee College in the early 1840s to pursue a career in law, and quickly developed a reputation among his peers for his reasoning ability and biting sarcastic style. He spent much of his first two terms in Congress fighting to preserve the Union, and during the Civil War, he consistently urged President Abraham Lincoln to send Union forces to free East Tennessee from its Confederate occupiers. Maynard returned to Congress after the war, but being a Republican in a Democrat-controlled state, he struggled in statewide elections.

== Biography ==
=== Early life ===
Born in Westborough, Massachusetts, Maynard was educated at Millbury Academy and later at Amherst College. When Maynard entered Amherst, he puzzled his classmates by placing a "V" above his door, the meaning of which was revealed in 1838 when Maynard was named valedictorian of his graduating class. In 1839, he moved to Knoxville, Tennessee, where he accepted a position as a professor at East Tennessee College (now the University of Tennessee). He initially taught in the university's preparatory (high school) department, but in 1841 he became a college-level teacher of mathematics and ancient languages.

Maynard was initially disenchanted with Knoxville, which he considered backward and unsophisticated, and contemplated leaving Tennessee. After he was admitted to the bar in 1844, however, he found a niche arguing cases in local courts, and decided to make the city his permanent home. Knoxville attorney Oliver Perry Temple (1820–1907), a colleague of Maynard, described Maynard as "abrupt and unamiable, and often offensive in his manners, snapping up men without hesitation." This style agitated Maynard's peers, but at the same time gained their respect.

=== Early congressional terms ===
When Maynard first ran for Congress in 1852, he was ruthlessly attacked in local newspapers, and was defeated by William Churchwell. In 1856, with the Knoxville Whig backing his campaign, he captured the 2nd District's congressional seat. In his 1858 reelection campaign, Maynard easily defeated fellow attorney J. C. Ramsey, winning 67% of the vote.

Maynard initially supported the Whig Party, and served as a presidential elector in 1852. After the collapse of the Whig Party, he ran for Congress on the American, Opposition and Union party tickets for congressional terms beginning in 1857, 1859, and 1861, respectively.

=== Secession crisis and views on slavery ===
Maynard's complex views on slavery reflected shifting sentiments that were common among East Tennessee unionists. During the 1830s, Maynard, the son of an abolitionist, found slavery contemptible, calling it "a curse to the country." By 1850, however, Maynard was defending the practice of slavery in letters to his father, arguing there was a "bright as well as a dark side to slavery." In 1860, Maynard had previously owned four slaves, and while he opposed secession as a congressman, he nevertheless defended slavery. Near the end of the Civil War, Maynard shifted once again to an abolitionist viewpoint on slavery, and supported Lincoln's Emancipation Proclamation.

Along with fellow unionists Andrew Johnson, T. A. R. Nelson, and William G. Brownlow, Maynard worked feverishly to keep Tennessee in the Union amidst the secession crisis of 1860 and 1861. In the weeks leading up to the state's June 8 referendum on the state's inevitable secession, Maynard travelled across East Tennessee, giving dozens of pro-Union speeches. Maynard was also a member of the Knox County delegation to the pro-Union East Tennessee Convention, which sought to create a separate Union-aligned state in East Tennessee. However, their attempts failed miserably, with East Tennessee becoming a fiercely controlled component of the Confederacy through martial law. Maynard, along with many other southern unionists civilians and politicians, fled the state and the south as a whole.

=== Civil War ===
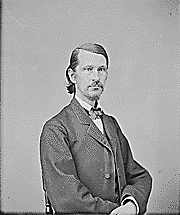
Maynard, photographed by Mathew Brady in the 1860s

After the East Tennessee Union Convention adjourned in June 1861, Maynard headed for Washington, D.C. to take his seat in Congress. When Confederate forces occupied East Tennessee later that year, Maynard consistently pleaded with Lincoln to send troops to free the region, warning that East Tennesseans' "tears and blood will be a blot on your administration that time can never efface." In December 1861, Maynard blasted General George H. Thomas for balking at an invasion of the region in the wake of so-called bridge-burning conspiracy, calling his efforts "disgraceful." Later that month, General George B. McClellan wrote to General Don Carlos Buell:

Johnson, Maynard, etc., are again becoming frantic, and have President Lincoln's sympathy excited. Political considerations would make it advisable to get the arms and troops into Eastern Tennessee at a very early day ...

In spite of Maynard's efforts, Union troops did not enter Knoxville until September 1863. By the time Maynard returned to the city, a rift had developed among East Tennessee's unionists between those who supported the Emancipation Proclamation (led by Maynard and Brownlow) and those who simply sought a return to the pre-war status quo (led by Nelson and Knoxville mayor James C. Luttrell). In 1864, Maynard was appointed Tennessee's attorney general by Andrew Johnson, who had been installed as the state's military governor.

=== Postwar activities ===
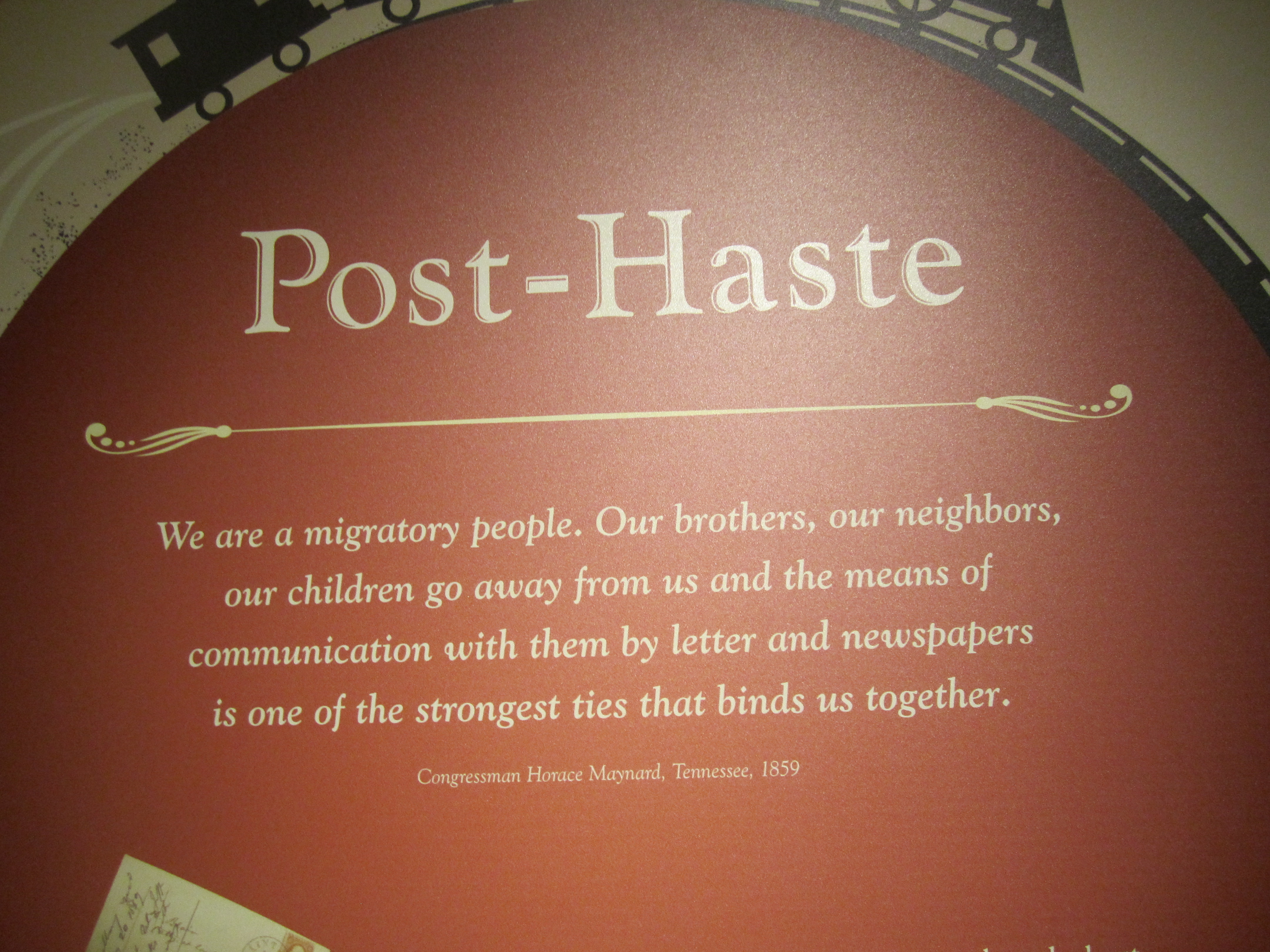
Maynard's quotation on the importance of mail delivery at the National Postal Museum in Washington, D.C.

Maynard attended the National Union Convention in 1866 and was elected to the 39th Congress as an Unconditional Unionist the same year following the readmission of Tennessee into the Union. He then served in the 40th, 41st, 42nd and 43rd Congresses as a Republican. During the 43rd Congress he acted as chairman of the U.S. House Committee on Banking and Currency. In 1868, while serving in Congress, Maynard was appointed to the Tennessee Supreme Court by Governor Brownlow to fill the vacancy created by the resignation of Samuel Milligan. Maynard held both offices simultaneously, but his right to do so was challenged in Calloway v. Strum, 48 Tennessee (1 Heiskell), 764. The court in that case held that Maynard's judicial acts were valid based on the presumption that his acceptance of the Supreme Court appointment constituted a resignation of his congressional office, and that it was up to Congress to address his continued occupation of that office. Maynard's name was on the ballot to be nominated for Vice President in the 1872 National Union Republican Convention held in Philadelphia on June 5 and 6. Maynard lost and only received 26 total votes. All 24 from Tennessee, and 1 each from Alabama and Mississippi.

Maynard reached the height of his political career in 1872 when he defeated both former President Andrew Johnson and popular West Tennessee general Benjamin F. Cheatham in the race for Tennessee's 1872 at-large congressional district special election. The following year, he ran for Governor of Tennessee as a Republican, but lost to James D. Porter. He was appointed Minister to Turkey and served from 1875 to 1880 in that post. He was appointed United States Postmaster General in the Cabinet of President Rutherford B. Hayes and served from June 2, 1880 to March 5, 1881.

Maynard died suddenly from heart disease in Knoxville in 1882, and was buried in Knoxville's Old Gray Cemetery.

== Legacy ==
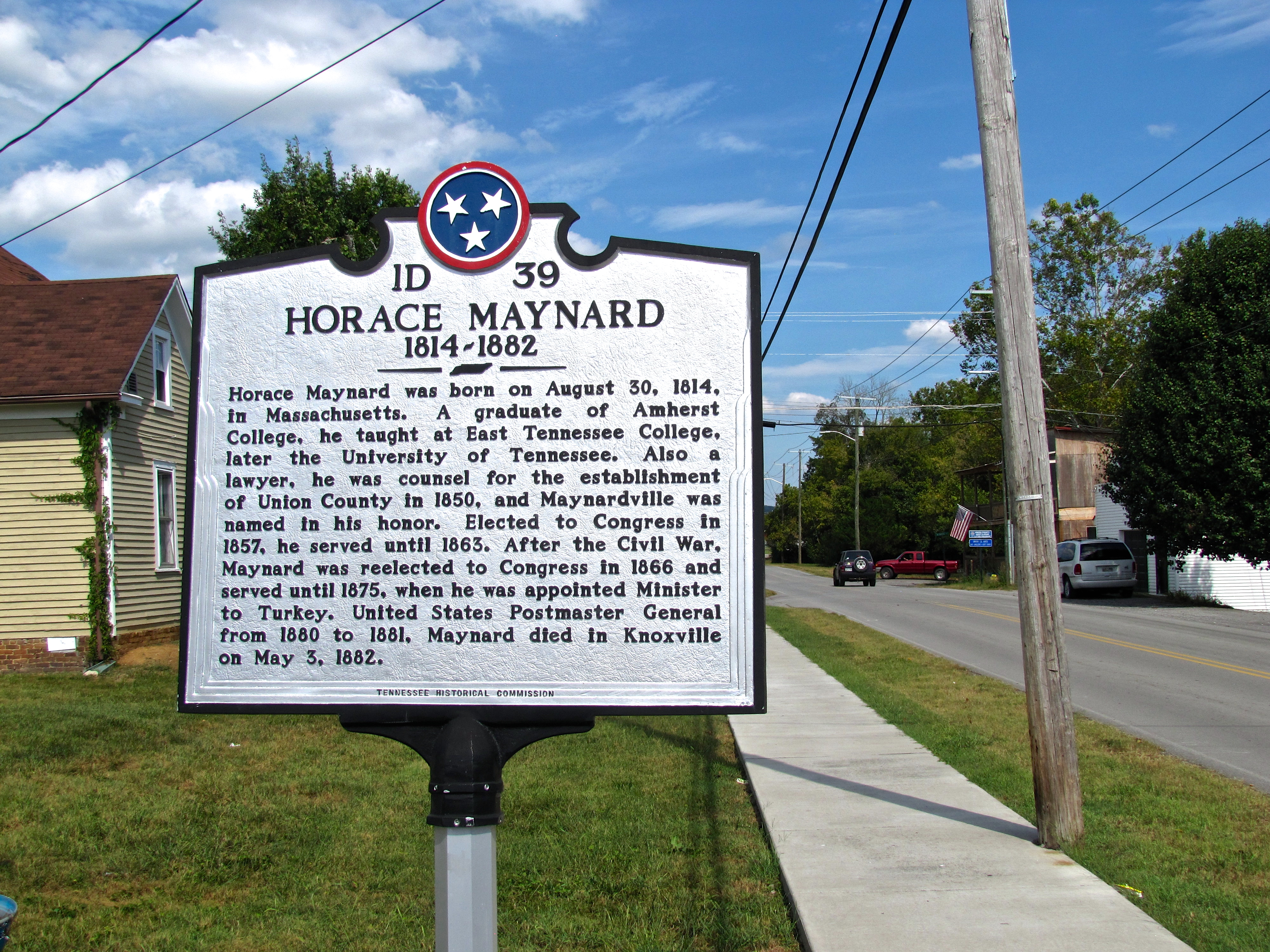
Tennessee Historical Commission marker in Maynardville

Maynard was remembered among his peers for his powerful intellect and sense of persuasiveness. Knoxville Journal editor William Rule wrote that Maynard was the "best read man" of East Tennessee's lawyers, while abolitionist Frederick Douglass once remarked that Maynard had a "three story head." Knoxville mayor Peter Staub (a Democrat) said that even though he disliked Maynard, he was so impressed with Maynard's reasoning and rhetoric that he voted for him twice. Oliver Perry Temple wrote of Maynard: "Many were the persons he stung and wounded by his biting sarcasm or pungent wit." Humorist George Washington Harris mocked Maynard ("Stilyards") in his story, "The Widow McCloud's Mare".

During the 1850s, Knox County attempted to sue the newly formed Union County, Tennessee, out of existence. Maynard successfully represented Union County, and in return, the county named its county seat, Maynardville, in his honor. Horace Maynard High School served the county from 1923 until 1997, when it became a middle school. During the Spanish–American War, the USS Nashville, commanded by Maynard's son, Washburn, fired the war's first American shot. Another son, James, was president of the Knoxville-based Brookside Mills in the early 1900s.

== See also ==
- 1872 United States House of Representatives elections in Tennessee

== References and notes ==
U.S. House of Representatives
Preceded by William Sneed	Member of the U.S. House of Representatives from Tennessee's 2nd congressional district 1857–1863	Vacant Title next held by Himself
Vacant Title last held by Himself	Member of the U.S. House of Representatives from Tennessee's 2nd congressional district 1866–1873	Succeeded by Jacob Thornburgh
New constituency	Member of the U.S. House of Representatives from Tennessee's at-large congressional district 1873–1875	Constituency abolished
Party political offices
Preceded by Alfred A. Freeman	Republican nominee for Governor of Tennessee; 1874	Succeeded by George Maney
Diplomatic posts
Preceded by George Boker	United States Minister to the Ottoman Empire; 1875–1880	Succeeded by James Longstreet
Diplomatic posts
Preceded by David M. Key	United States Postmaster General; 1880–1881	Succeeded by Thomas James
