= Martha Tracy Owler =

American journalist and writer

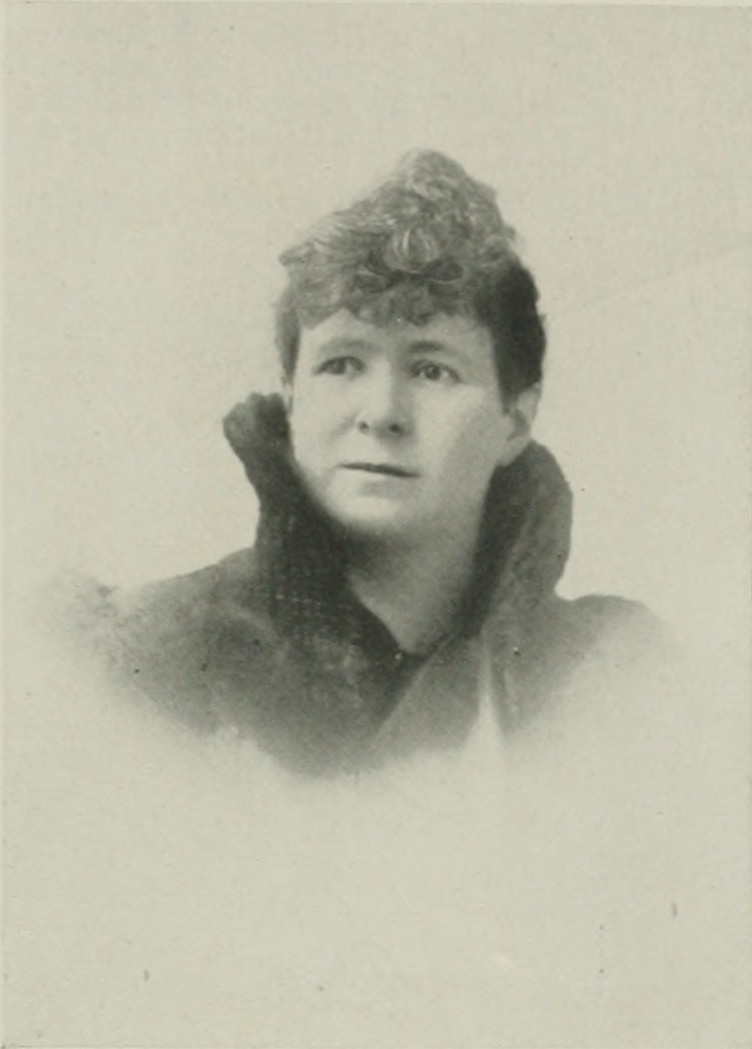
- Portrait from A Woman of the Century
- Born: Martha Ruth Tracy; 1852; Port Deposit, Maryland, U.S.
- Died: October 3, 1916 (aged 63–64); New York City, New York, U.S.
- Resting place: Beverly, Massachusetts, U.S.
- Occupations: journalist, correspondent
- Spouse: Charles William Owler (m. 1876)
- Relatives: Joseph Tracy (grandfather); Horace Maynard (uncle); William M. Evarts
- Writing career
- Subjects: travel correspondence; art criticism

Martha Tracy Owler (1852 – October 3, 1916) was an American journalist and writer. During 1891–95, she was foreign correspondent for the Boston Herald. Her letters to the Herald from Europe were in great demand, as were her art sketches for another Boston publication, written over a pen name. She had an intense love of beautiful art, and although she never posed as an art critic, her articles were quoted from and copied in New York and other papers as art criticisms. Scholars said that her language was like that of Washington Irving.

== Early life and education ==
Martha Ruth Tracy was born in Port Deposit, Maryland (Note: According to Willard & Livermore (1893), Owler was born in Boston, Massachusetts.) in 1852. Her parents were George Hopkins Tracy (1830-1856) and Martha Delaney (Bartholomew) (1833-1899). Martha had two younger siblings.

Her childhood was passed in the family of her guardian and grandfather, the Rev. Dr. Joseph Tracy, who was connected with the press in New York City and Boston. She was the niece of Postmaster General Horace Maynard of Tennessee, and was also related to William M. Evarts.

When a child, she amused herself by writing stories, which showed her power of imagination. She developed a fondness for art and constantly studied, both in Europe and the U.S.

== Career ==
For two or three years, she was served as a principal of some of the large schools in and around Boston.

With a desire to pursue writing, she accepted a position on the Malden, Massachusetts, Mirror, where her contributions attracted the attention of the city editor of the Boston Herald. She was asked if she was willing to try an experiment by that newspaper—the experiment being "to see whether women could 'cover' a given territory as quickly and as efficaciously as men could". For nearly a year, she covered a district comprising a large city and four towns, giving everything -social, religious, governmental, political, legal, or professional- regarding them by producing good results, often driving alone into Boston over dark bridges and in storms after midnight with the latest news. The constant action was too wearing for her, and she was transferred from the district department -the only woman who had ever covered such a department on a Boston daily paper- to the Herald's special and general staff.

In the summer of 1890, she was sent by the Boston Herald on a European mission, and her description of the "Passion Play" and her letters from various parts of France, Great Britain and Ireland were widely read. She went abroad in 1891 as the foreign representative of that paper, after having written extensively on art subjects for Frank Leslie's Monthly. She spent the year 1892 abroad in the interests of the Boston Herald, in Brittany, Alsace–Lorraine, Italy, and the Scandinavian peninsula. She was accompanied to Europe by her only son, Charles, then age twelve. Owler founded the "Italian letter" to the Musical Courier, and syndicated her letters to the Boston Herald throughout the U.S.

It was due to Owler that the Maccari frescoes became known in the U.S., and she also made known to U.S. music lovers the Italian pianist and composer Giovanni Sgambati, and Oreste Vessella, the Italian bandmaster. With the Countess Pagolini in Rome, where Owler spent years in work and study, she revived interest among Americans there and in the U.S. in the old Italian point lace industry.

Returning to the U.S. circa 1896, she soon acquired a reputation as an art writer and critic. During her last 15 years, Owler was the press representative and catalog and advertising writer for Silo's Fifth Avenue Art Galleries.

== Personal life ==
On June 10, 1876, in Boston, she married Charles William Owler (b. 1850). They had two children: George (1877-1877) and Charles (1878-1949).)

In her later life, Owler struggled with ill health, aggravated by injuries received from being struck by a trolley car in 1912.

Martha Tracy Owler died at the Knickerbocker Hospital in New York City, October 3, 1916. Interment took place at Beverly, Massachusetts.

== Selected works ==
=== Books ===
- Semi-centennial souvenir; Alfred University, the mountain college; its patriotic aim and noble work, 1857-1907, 1907 (text)

=== Articles ===
- "Mud and Mildew", Wide Awake, 1889
- "Selections. The Passion Play", Saints Herald, 1890
- "Marie Goegg-Pouchoulin. The Lucy Stone of Europe.", Baltimore News, St. Louis Republic, 1892
- "Maccari's Frescoes. Works remarkable for size, historic truth, and artistic merit. Chicago Inter Ocean, 1892
- "Rome's Noted Festa. How Italy's children petition the Bambino." Chicago Inter Ocean, 1892
- "Divine Memoriae. Imposing ceremonies in the Vatican". Chicago Inter Ocean, 1892
- "From Across the Sea. Alladin's Palace in Rome. What Princess Bonaparte is doing for the poor. The Sunday Inter Ocean, 1892
- "A Palace Garden", Los Angeles Times, 1894
- "Grandmother's Holiday Recipes", Good Housekeeping, 1905
- "Tomatoes with Olive Oil", Good Housekeeping, 1905
