= Joseph Tracy =

American Congregational minister (1793–1874)

Joseph Tracy (1793–1874) was an American Protestant minister, newspaper editor, historian and leader in the American Colonization Society. He is noted as a typical figure of the New England Renaissance.

== Early life and education ==
Joseph Tracy was born November 3, 1793, in Hartford, Vermont, as the eldest child of Joseph and Ruth Carter Tracy. By his own account, he "was a farmer's boy and student alternately, or sometimes both at once," until he graduated with a Master of Arts from Dartmouth College in 1814, after election to Phi Beta Kappa society. The degree of Doctor of Divinity was awarded him by the University of Vermont in 1859, after he had won his fame.

== Early career ==
Like many other college graduates of his day, he first supported himself by teaching. In 1817, he was chosen as principal of Royalton Academy in Vermont. In a letter of recommendation it was said of him "I know him to be one of the best linguists and classical scholars in general who have been this number of years at Dartmouth College. . .You will find him to be not a fine gentleman nor a showy pedagogue but a useful instructor." It was there he met his first wife, Eleanor Washburn, whom he married in 1819. An admirer of educated women, he taught her Latin and began Greek, until the demands of family life cut short her studies. At this time, he also began the study of law.

== Later life and work ==
However, he gave up the law for the ministry, studying under Asa Burton of Thetford, Vermont, and was admitted to the ministry of the Congregational Churches on June 26, 1821. From 1821 to 1828 he held the pastorates of two churches in villages near Thetford, but by the latter year it became apparent that his true work lay in a different branch of church activities. He was appointed in the autumn of 1828 to take the editorship of the "Vermont Chronicle", an organ of the Vermont Congregational Churches, which had been founded in 1826 by his younger brother, Ebenezer Carter Tracy. In 1834, he again exchanged positions with his brother, becoming editor of the Boston Recorder. He also served for a short time in 1837 as editor of the New York Observer. During and after this time he published several books, including: The Three Last Things, 1839, an essay on resurrection, judgment and final retribution; The Great Awakening, 1842, a history of the religious revival in America in the mid to late 18th century (some scholars attribute the well-known name of that movement to Rev. Tracy's work); and The History of the Missions of the American Board, 1842.

Tracy had eight children with his first wife, Eleanor, who died in 1836. He remarried in 1842 to Sarah Prince. In his later years, he was cared for by his wife and two unmarried daughters. He was the guardian of his granddaughter, Martha Tracy Owler. He died in his home in Beverly, Massachusetts, on March 24, 1874, after a short illness.

== Views and affiliations ==
Tracy's theological views were absolutely orthodox for his denomination, even puritan in outlook. However, in a time of extreme turbulence in his church, his tolerance was notable. Tradition within the Tracy family suggests that he assisted Samuel F. B. Morse with the development of the Morse code when in New York, despite Morse's well-known unorthodox ideas. Although this is mere tradition, Tracy did have a reputation as a man with an extraordinarily extensive fund of knowledge in varied fields. The story is told that a friend was talking to another about a certain type of copper found in England. The friend said "Mr. Tracy could tell you if he was here!" and then looking up, saw him. The friend couldn’t resist. "Mr. Tracy, what is Bungtown Copper?" Tracy replied that it was an expression shortened from Birmingham Copper and proceeded to go into a deep explanation of the meaning of the term.

From his college days, Tracy was closely associated with the New England group who were leaders in the development of political feeling in the north, most notably Rufus Choate and Daniel Webster, both fellow Dartmouth graduates. In 1842, he began his life work as secretary of the Massachusetts Colonization Society, an affiliate of the American Colonization Society, a position he held until his death in 1874. He became a director of the parent society in 1858 and attended the annual meetings at the Washington headquarters. The "Memorial of the Semi-Centennial Anniversary of the American Colonization Society," published 1867, contains a historical account by him of the work of the society.

These Societies, which arose in several states including the South, beginning in 1817, undertook to solve, or alleviate, the slavery question by acquiring freedom for black slaves and transporting them by ship back to Africa. In actuality, the motives of the colonization supporters were mixed - many supporters were no abolitionists, but instead wanted to be rid of the free Negro population. By the time Tracy began his work, it was clear that large-scale colonization was a failure and that much of the movement was discredited.

Tracy's did not view Liberia as a mere convenient place for an inconvenient population. Besides sincere anti-slavery views, he saw African colonization as a way of Christian mission. He also had an important influence in the founding of the college at Liberia and bringing it into successful operation.

Tracy was in some ways a typical figure in the period of American history known as the New England Renaissance. His upbringing and inclination looked back to the Pilgrim fathers - he called Christmas a heathen holiday, yet never interfered with his family's celebration of it - but his education and tolerance heralded the beginnings of a more modern sensibility.
