= Goodspeed Publishing =

United States publishing firm

History of Tennessee (1886) readable pdf

Goodspeed Publishing was established by Westin Arthur Goodspeed in the late 19th century and was based in Nashville, Tennessee, St Louis, Missouri and Chicago, Illinois. By the early 1880s Goodspeed had success with a series of state and regional histories in Ohio, Pennsylvania, and other northern states, and went on to repeat that success in other areas of the U.S.

The publications were primarily divided into sections for each county they studied, and included descriptions of each area's geography, history, government, and religious institutions. Each edition included biographies of prominent citizens. Local industries, businesses, and agriculture were also described, providing a glimpse of late 19th century life in places often ignored by other histories. Goodspeed's attempt to include Native American history in many of these volumes was unusual at that time.

Goodspeed publications have economic data and personal biographies of those who played significant roles in their communities and states.

== Selected publications ==
- History of Greene and Sullivan Counties, State of Indiana (Chicago: Goodspeed Brothers & Co. Publishers, 1884)
- History of Pike and Dubois Counties, Indiana (Chicago: Goodspeed Brothers & Co. Publishers, 1885)
- History of Warrick, Spencer and Perry Counties, Indiana (Chicago: Goodspeed Brothers & Co. Publishers, 1885)
- History of Tennessee from the Earliest Time to the Present (Chicago: Goodspeed Publishing, 1886)
- A History of Knox and Daviess Counties, Indiana (Chicago: Goodspeed Publishing, 1886)
- Wyandotte County and Kansas City, Kansas, Historical and Biographical (Chicago: Goodspeed Publishing, 1886)
- The History of Southeast Missouri (Chicago: Goodspeed Publishing, 1886)
- History of Franklin, Jefferson, Washington, Crawford, and Gasconade Counties, Missouri (Chicago: Goodspeed Publishing, 1889)
- Biographical and Historical Memoirs of Northeast Arkansas (Chicago: Goodspeed Publishing, 1889)
- History of Hickory, Polk, Cedar, Dade, and Barton Counties Missouri (Chicago: Goodspeed Publishing, 1889)
- Biographical and Historical Memoirs of Central Arkansas (Chicago: Goodspeed Publishing, 1889)
- Biographical and Historical Memoirs of Eastern Arkansas (Chicago: Goodspeed Brothers, 1890)
- Biographical and Historical Memoirs of Adams, Clay, Hall and Hamilton counties, Nebraska (Chicago: Goodspeed Publishing, 1890)
- Biographical and Historical Memoirs of Southern Arkansas (Chicago: Goodspeed Publishing, 1890)
- Biographical and Historical Memoirs of Mississippi 2 vols. (Chicago: Goodspeed Publishing, 1891)
- Biographical and Historical Memoirs of Louisiana. 2 vols. (Chicago: Goodspeed Publishing, 1892)
- Industrial Chicago the Manufacturing Interests (Chicago: Goodspeed Publishing, 1894)
- Memorial and Genealogical Record of Southwest Texas (Chicago: Goodspeed Publishing, 1894)
- A Reminiscent History of the Ozark Region (Chicago: Goodspeed Publishing, 1894)
- Memorial and Genealogical Record of Texas (Chicago: Goodspeed Publishing, 1894)

== See also ==
- Books in the United States
