= Alf Freeman (footballer, born 1904) =

English footballer

Personal information
- Full name: James Alfred Freeman
- Date of birth: 13 July 1904
- Place of birth: Ilkeston, England
- Date of death: 1966 (aged 61–62)
- Position: Right half

Senior career*
Years	Team	Apps	(Gls)
- Sutton Town
1925	Blackpool	0	(0)
1927	Lincoln City	2	(0)
- Mansfield Town
- Frickley Colliery
- * Club domestic league appearances and goals

James Alfred Freeman (13 July 1904 – 1966) was an English professional footballer. He was on the books of five clubs, but is only known to have made Football League appearances for Lincoln City, in 1927.
