= Jacob Montgomery Thornburgh =

American politician (1837–1890)

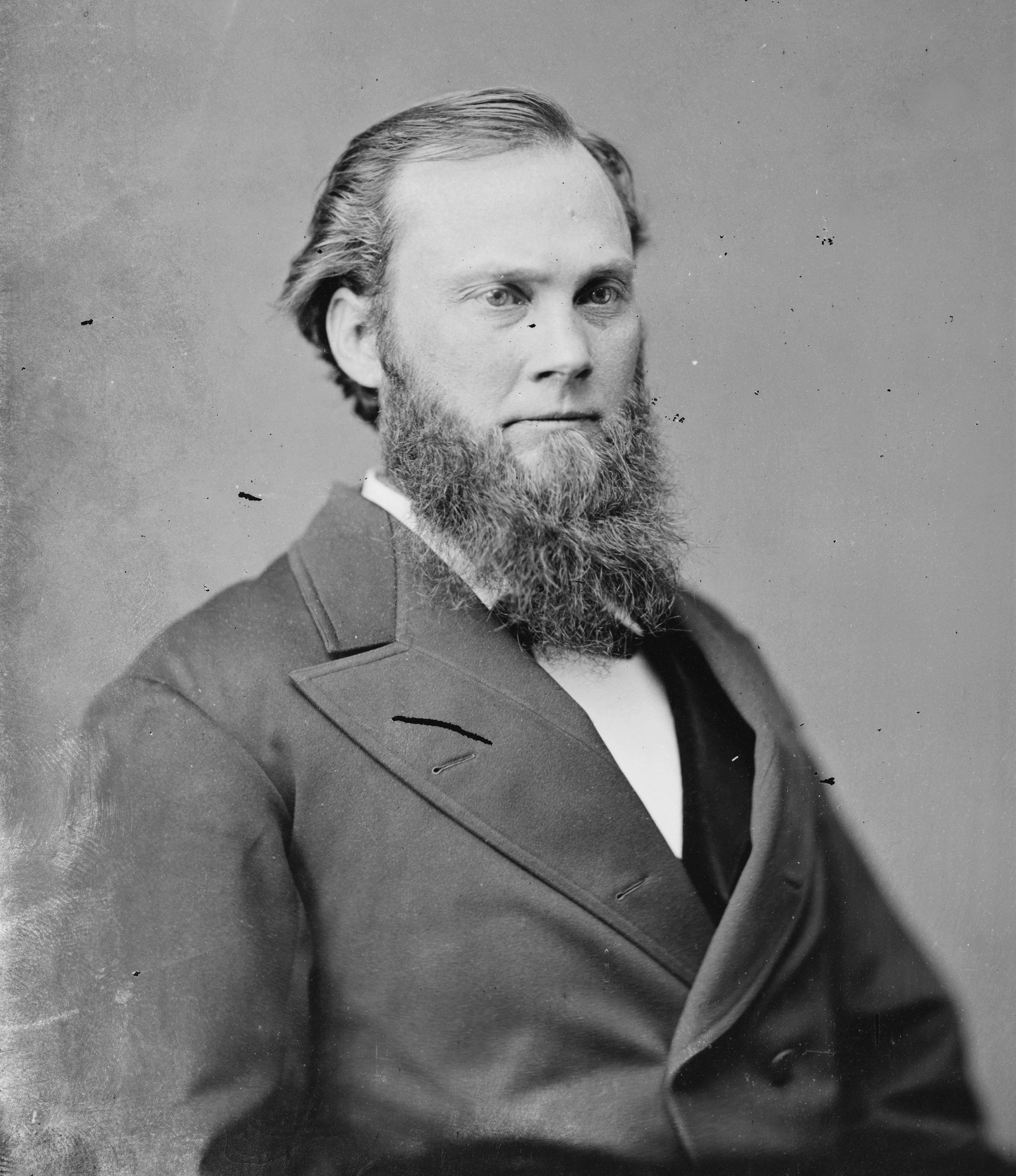

Member of the U.S. House of Representatives from Tennessee's 2nd district
- In office March 4, 1873 – March 3, 1879
- Preceded by: Horace Maynard
- Succeeded by: Leonidas C. Houk

Personal details
- Born: July 3, 1837 New Market, Tennessee, U.S.
- Died: September 19, 1890 (aged 53) Knoxville, Tennessee, U.S.
- Resting place: Old Gray Cemetery; Knoxville, Tennessee, U.S.
- Party: Republican
- Spouse(s): Adaline Smith; Laura Emma Pettibone
- Education: Holston College
- Profession: Attorney, Politician

Jacob Montgomery Thornburgh (July 3, 1837– September 19, 1890) was an American attorney and politician who represented Tennessee's 2nd congressional district in the United States House of Representatives from 1873 to 1879. The son of a prominent state legislator, Thornburgh fought in the Union Army during the Civil War, and served as attorney general of the state's third judicial district after the war. Following his congressional term, he formed a law partnership with several prominent Knoxville attorneys, and engaged in philanthropy.

== Biography ==
=== Early life ===
Thornburgh was born in New Market, Tennessee in Jefferson County. His father, Montgomery Thornburgh, was a Tennessee state senator and attorney general. His mother was Olivia. He attended Holston College (in New Market), and studied law under his father and Judge Robert McFarland. He was admitted to the bar in 1861, after which he commenced practice in Jefferson County. His brother, Major Thomas Tipton Thornburgh, was commander of Fort Steele and was killed during the Battle of Milk Creek in 1879.

=== Civil War and aftermath ===
At the outbreak of the Civil War, Thornburgh fled to Kentucky and enlisted as a private in a brigade commanded by General George W. Morgan. In 1862, he joined what would eventually become the 4th Regiment Tennessee Volunteer Cavalry with the rank of lieutenant colonel. He became commander of the unit following the resignation of Colonel Richard M. Edwards in July 1863. He saw action at the Battle of Okolona, and led one of the first units into Mobile, Alabama, after the city fell in 1865. Thornburgh's father, a prominent Unionist, was arrested by Confederate authorities during the war and died in a Confederate prison in Georgia. His brother, Thomas, enlisted in the Sixth East Tennessee Volunteers and rose through the ranks, establishing a career as an officer in the military. He died in the western frontier during the Battle of Milk Creek with the Utes in 1879.

Thornburgh was appointed attorney general of the third judicial circuit of Tennessee in 1866, and was elected to this office in 1868 and 1870. In spite of his family's hardships during the war, he was conciliatory in his actions toward former Confederates, and briefly practiced law with his old mentor, Robert McFarland, who had supported the Confederacy. In 1872, Thornburgh was appointed United States commissioner at the International Exposition held in Vienna, Austria.

=== Congressional career ===
In the early 1870s, Tennessee's Democrat-controlled legislature gerrymandered the 2nd Congressional District in hopes of breaking Republicans' electoral dominance in the district. Sensing defeat, the district's Republican congressman, Horace Maynard, withdrew from the race for the 2nd District seat and instead ran for the state's at-large district seat. Thornburgh accepted the Republican Party's nomination for the 2nd District seat, and in spite of the Democrats' redistricting efforts, won the seat in the general election.

In the election of 1874, Leonidas C. Houk challenged Thornburgh for the Republican nomination for the 2nd District's seat. After a very competitive campaign, both candidates claimed the nomination, and both intended to run in the general election, which would have split the Republican vote and threaten the party's hold on the seat. Senator William G. Brownlow, by this time a revered figure among East Tennesseans, intervened on Thornburgh's behalf, and Houk withdrew, allowing Thornburgh to coast to an easy victory. Thornburgh ran unchallenged in 1876, and decided not to seek reelection in 1878.

=== Later life ===
Thornburgh largely retired from political life after 1879, although he was a delegate to the Republican National Convention in 1880. He returned to Knoxville and formed a law partnership with Charles D. McGuffey (a nephew of William Holmes McGuffey, author of the McGuffey Readers), and later formed a partnership with future Supreme Court justice Edward Terry Sanford. In 1889, Thornburgh donated a large number of books to the burgeoning Lawson McGhee Library.

Thornburgh died on September 19, 1890, and was interred in Old Gray Cemetery. His daughter, Laura Thornburgh, was a journalist and author, perhaps best known for publishing one of the first hiking guides to the Great Smoky Mountains National Park in 1937. His son, John Minnis Thornburgh, was a prominent Knoxville lawyer and Republican Party leader during the early 20th century.

U.S. House of Representatives
Preceded by Horace Maynard	Member of the U.S. House of Representatives from Tennessee's 2nd congressional district 1873–1879	Succeeded by Leonidas C. Houk
