= David M. Key =

American politician and judge (1824–1900)

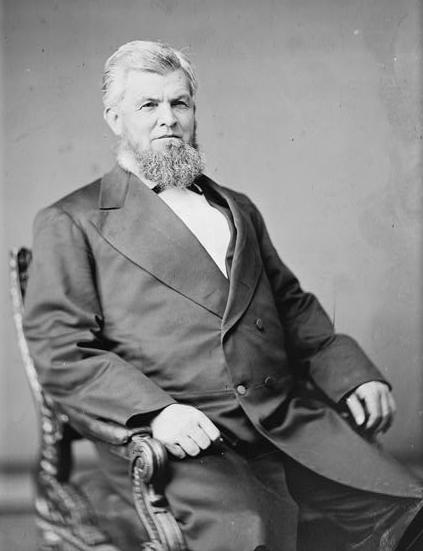
- Key, 1865–1880

Judge of the United States District Court for the Eastern District of Tennessee Judge of the United States District Court for the Middle District of Tennessee
- In office May 27, 1880 – January 21, 1895
- Appointed by: Rutherford B. Hayes
- Preceded by: Connally Findlay Trigg
- Succeeded by: Charles Dickens Clark

27th United States Postmaster General
- In office March 12, 1877 – June 2, 1880
- President: Rutherford B. Hayes
- Preceded by: James Noble Tyner
- Succeeded by: Horace Maynard

United States Senator from Tennessee
- In office August 18, 1875 – January 19, 1877
- Appointed by: James D. Porter
- Preceded by: Andrew Johnson
- Succeeded by: James E. Bailey

Personal details
- Born: David McKendree Key; January 27, 1824 Greeneville, Tennessee, U.S.
- Died: February 3, 1900 (aged 76) Chattanooga, Tennessee, U.S.
- Resting place: Forest Hill Cemetery; Chattanooga, Tennessee
- Party: Democratic
- Education: Hiwassee College; University of Tennessee (A.M.) read law

Military service
- Allegiance: (Confederate States of America) Confederate States
- Branch/service: Confederate States Army
- Years of service: 1861–1865
- Rank: Lieutenant colonel
- Unit: 43rd Tennessee Regiment
- Battles/wars: American Civil War

David McKendree Key (January 27, 1824 – February 3, 1900) was a United States senator from Tennessee, United States Postmaster General and a United States district judge of the United States District Court for the Eastern District of Tennessee and the United States District Court for the Middle District of Tennessee.

== Education and career ==
Born on January 27, 1824, near Greeneville, in Greene County, Tennessee, Key attended the common schools, then graduated from Hiwassee College in 1850 and read law the same year. He received an Artium Magister degree from East Tennessee University (now the University of Tennessee). He was admitted to the bar and entered private practice in Madisonville, Tennessee from 1850 to 1852. He continued private practice in Kingston, Tennessee from 1852 to 1853, and in Chattanooga, Tennessee from 1853 to 1861. He was a Presidential Elector on the Democratic ticket in 1856 and 1860. He served in the Confederate States Army from 1861 to 1865, during the American Civil War and was promoted to lieutenant colonel of the Forty-third Tennessee Infantry. He resumed private practice in Chattanooga from 1865 to 1880. He was a member of the Tennessee constitutional convention in 1870. He was Chancellor for the Tennessee Chancery Court for the Third Judicial District from 1870 to 1875. He was an unsuccessful Democratic candidate for election to the United States House of Representatives of the 43rd United States Congress.

== Congressional service ==
Key was appointed as a Democrat to the United States Senate to fill the vacancy caused by the death of former President of the United States and United States Senator Andrew Johnson and served from August 18, 1875, to January 19, 1877. He was an unsuccessful candidate for election to fill the vacancy in 1876.

== Postmaster General ==
Key served as Postmaster General of the United States in the cabinet of President Rutherford B. Hayes from 1877 to 1880.

== Federal judicial service ==
Key was nominated by President Rutherford B. Hayes on May 19, 1880, to a joint seat on the United States District Court for the Eastern District of Tennessee and the United States District Court for the Middle District of Tennessee vacated by Judge Connally Findlay Trigg. He was confirmed by the United States Senate on May 27, 1880, and received his commission the same day. His service terminated on January 21, 1895, due to his retirement.

== Death ==
Key died on February 3, 1900, in Chattanooga. He was interred in Forest Hill Cemetery in Chattanooga.

== See also ==
- List of United States political appointments across party lines
- David McK. Key

== Sources ==
- United States Congress. "David McKendree Key (id: K000156)". Biographical Directory of the United States Congress.
- Goodspeed Publishing, History of East Tennessee, Hamilton County. (1887)
- Dictionary of American Biography
- Abshire, David. The South Rejects a Prophet: The Life of David Key. New York: F.A. Praeger, 1967.
- Murrin, John M. Liberty, Equality, Power. Fourth Edition. Australia: Thomson Wadsworth, 2005.

U.S. Senate
Preceded by Andrew Johnson	United States Senator (Class 1) from Tennessee; 1875–1877; Served alongside: Henry Cooper	Succeeded by James E. Bailey
Political offices
Preceded by James Noble Tyner	United States Postmaster General; 1877–1880	Succeeded by Horace Maynard
Legal offices
Preceded by Connally Findlay Trigg	Judge of the United States District Court for the Eastern District of Tennessee; Judge of the United States District Court for the Middle District of Tennessee; 1880–1895	Succeeded by Charles Dickens Clark
