= List of Beta Theta Pi members =

Beta Theta Pi is a North American social fraternity that was founded in 1839 at Miami University in Oxford, Ohio. As of 2025, it consists of 142 active chapters and nineteen colonies in the United States and Canada. It has initiated more than 227,200 members. Below is a list of some of the notable members of Beta Theta Pi fraternity.

== Academia ==
Name	Chapter and year	Notability	Ref.
Thomas Swain Barclay	Missouri 1915	Professor of political science at Stanford University	
Thomas A. Bartlett	Willamette 1951	Chancellor of the University of Alabama System	
George F. Baughman	Florida 1937	Founding president of New College of Florida	
David Ross Boyd	Wooster 1878	First president of the University of Oklahoma and president of the University of New Mexico	
Paul Bragdon	Amherst 1950	President of Reed College	
Leo V. Aspinwall	South Dakota 1912	Marketing professor who developed the Classification of Goods Theory	
James S. Buchanan	Cumberland 1885	President of the University of Oklahoma	
Thomas Courtice	Ohio Wesleyan	President of Ohio Wesleyan University	
Stanley Coulter	Hanover 1870	Dean of Purdue University	
John Patrick Crecine	Carnegie Mellon 1961	President of Georgia Tech	
William H. Danforth	Westminster 1948	Chancellor of Washington University in St. Louis	
Donald Dawson	Missouri 1932	Curator of the Harry S. Truman Presidential Library and Museum	
James Duderstadt	Yale 1964	President of the University of Michigan	
Joseph Dupuy Eggleston	Hampden-Sydney 1886	President of Virginia Tech	
Robert F. Engle	Williams 1964	Winner of the 2003 Nobel Memorial Prize in Economic Sciences; co-director of the Volatility and Risk Institute at New York University Stern School of Business	
Robin Hugh Farquhar	British Columbia 1960	President of Carleton University	
Carl Russell Fish	Harvard 1900	Historian at the University of Wisconsin–Madison	
Thomas P. Gerrity	MIT 1963	Dean of the Wharton School of Business	
William Pratt Graham	Syracuse 1903	Chancellor of Syracuse University	
Andrew Dousa Hepburn	Washington & Jefferson 1851	President of Miami University and Davidson College	
Alexander Q. Holladay	Virginia 1859	President of North Carolina State University and Virginia Senate	
John S. Hougham	Wabash 1846	President of Purdue University	
Frederick W. Doolittle	Princeton 1905	Transportation engineer and researcher specializing in public utilities	
Alfred Hume	Vanderbilt 1878	Chancellor of the University of Mississippi	
Charles Keeler	UC Berkeley 1893	Director of the California Academy of Sciences	
Samuel Laws	Miami University 1848	President of the University of Missouri and Westminster College	
Deane Waldo Malott	Kansas 1921	Chancellor of the University of Kansas and president of Cornell University	
William Alexander Parsons Martin	Indiana 1846	President of the Tongwenguan and the Imperial University of Peking	
David T. McLaughlin	Dartmouth 1954	President of Dartmouth College	
Dale T. Mortensen	Willamette 1961	Professor at Northwestern University and winner of the Nobel Memorial Prize in Economic Sciences	
Franklin David Murphy	Kansas 1936	Chancellor of the University of Kansas and UCLA	
James Kennedy Patterson	Hanover 1856	First president of the University of Kentucky	
Steven Sample	Illinois 1958	President of the University of Southern California	
James M. Sellers	Chicago 1916	President of Wentworth Military Academy	
Charles N. Sims	DePauw 1859	Chancellor of Syracuse University	
Edgar F. Shannon Jr.	W&L 1939	President of the University of Virginia	
Francis W. Shepardson	Denison 1882	Professor at the University of Chicago, director of the Illinois Department of Registration and Education, and secretary and acting director of the Julius Rosenwald Fund	
David M. Emmons	Colorado 1961	Historian specializing in Western American and Irish-American history known for The Butte Irish: Class and Ethnicity in an American Mining Town, 1875-1925	
David Stanton Tappan	Miami 1864	President of Miami University	
George Whipple	Yale 1905	Winner of the Nobel Prize in Physiology or Medicine in 1934; founding dean of the University of Rochester Medical Center	
Timothy M. Wolfe	Missouri 1980	President of the University of Missouri System	
Y. C. James Yen	Yale 1918	Founder of the Chinese Mass Education Movement	
Robert L. Stearns	Colorado 1914	6th President of the University of Colorado Boulder (1939–53); First alumnus and law school dean to serve as university president	
William L. Fox	St. Lawrence 1975	18th president of St. Lawrence University (2009-2021) & President of Culver-Stockton College (2003-2009)	

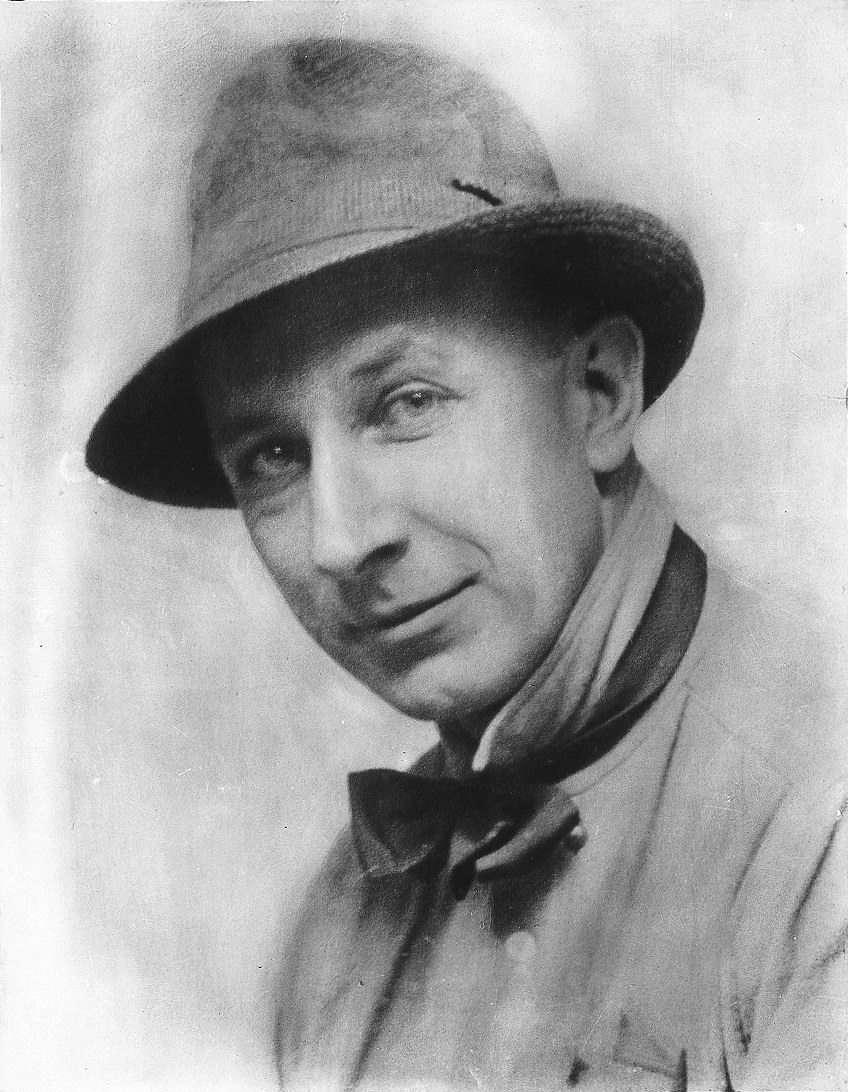
George Bellows

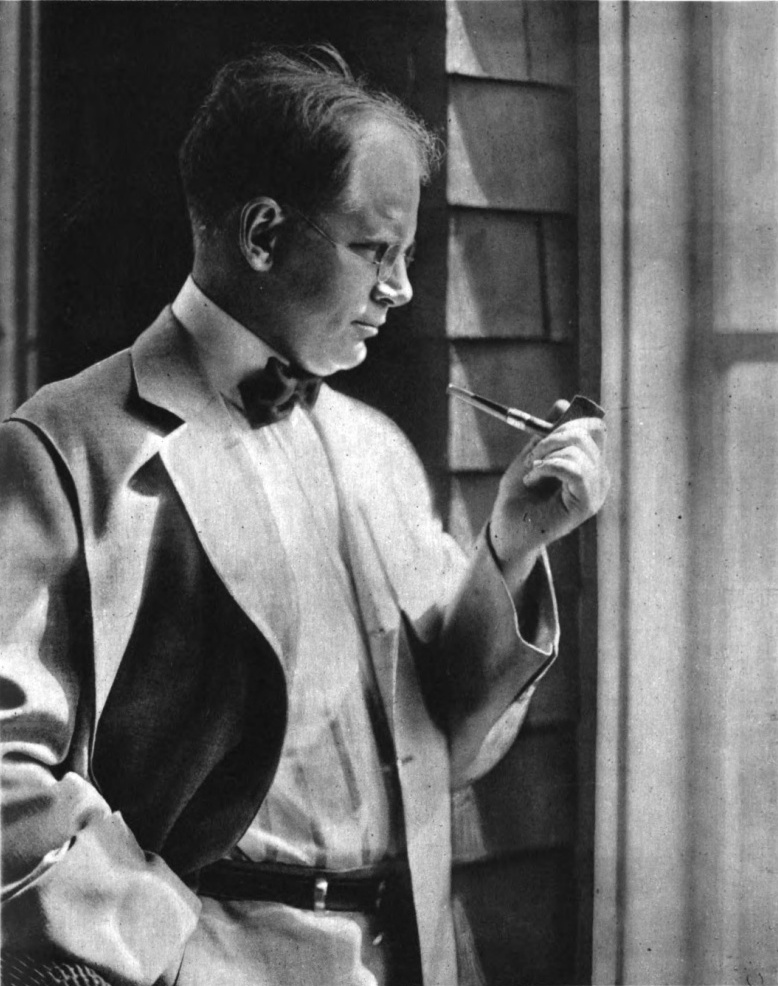
Ding Darling

== Art and architecture ==
Name	Chapter and year	Notability	Ref.
John Bakewell Jr.	Cal Berkeley 1893	Architect	
George Bellows	Ohio State 1905	Realist painter	
Glen H. Huntington	Colorado 1912	Architect	
Bernard Berenson	Boston 1887	Art historian	
Barry Bishop	Cincinnati 1951	Photographer for National Geographic and part of the first American team to summit Mount Everest	
Arthur Brown Jr.	Cal Berkeley 1896	Architect	
Frederic M. Pannebaker	Colorado 1934	Denver lithographer, fine-art printer, and printing industry leader. President of the Rocky Mountain Club of Printing House Craftsmen (1955)	
Ding Darling	Beloit 1899	Cartoonist who won the Pulitzer Prize in Editorial Cartooning twice, head of the U.S. Biological Survey, and founder and first president of the National Wildlife Federation	

== Astronauts ==
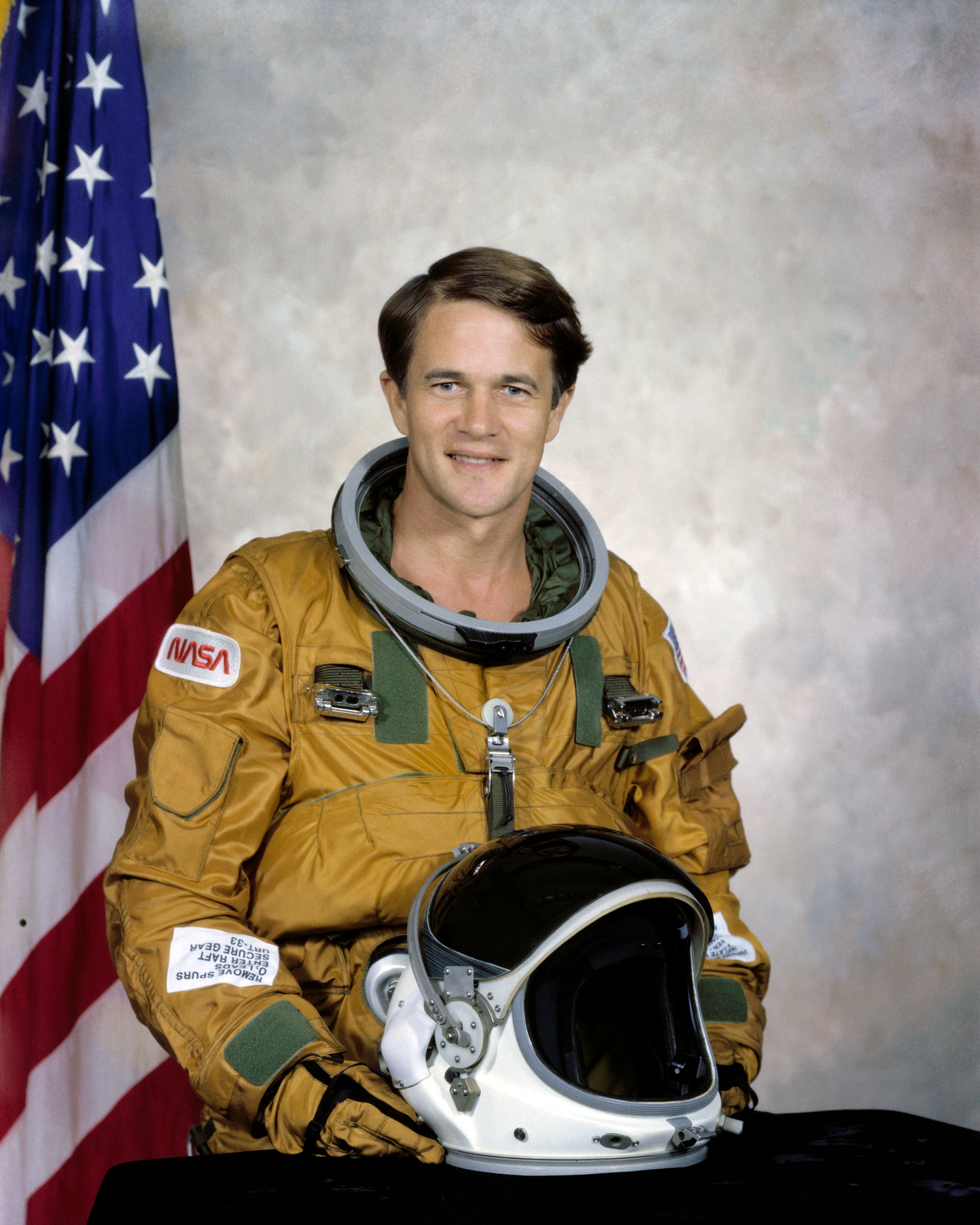
Joseph Allen

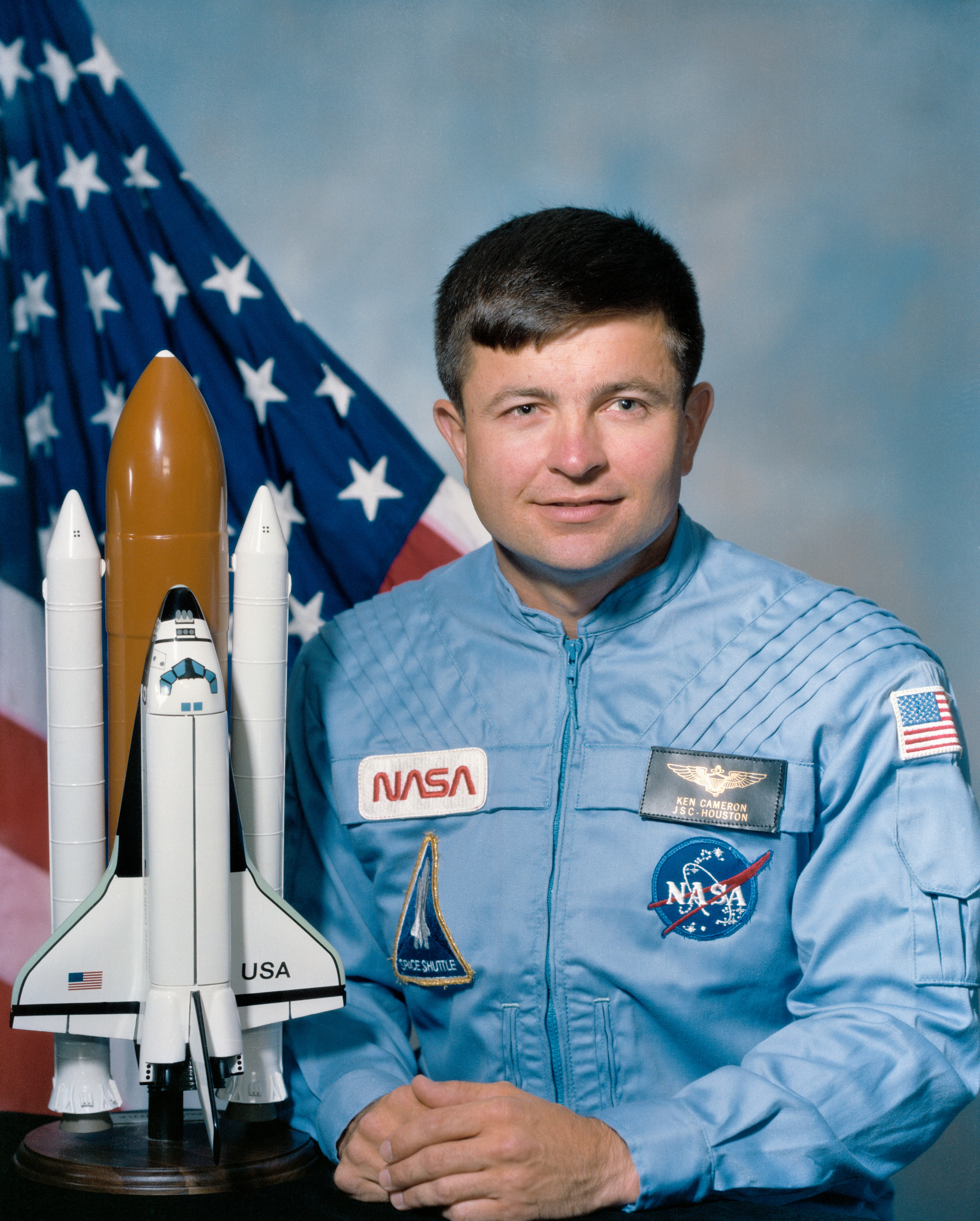
Ken Cameron

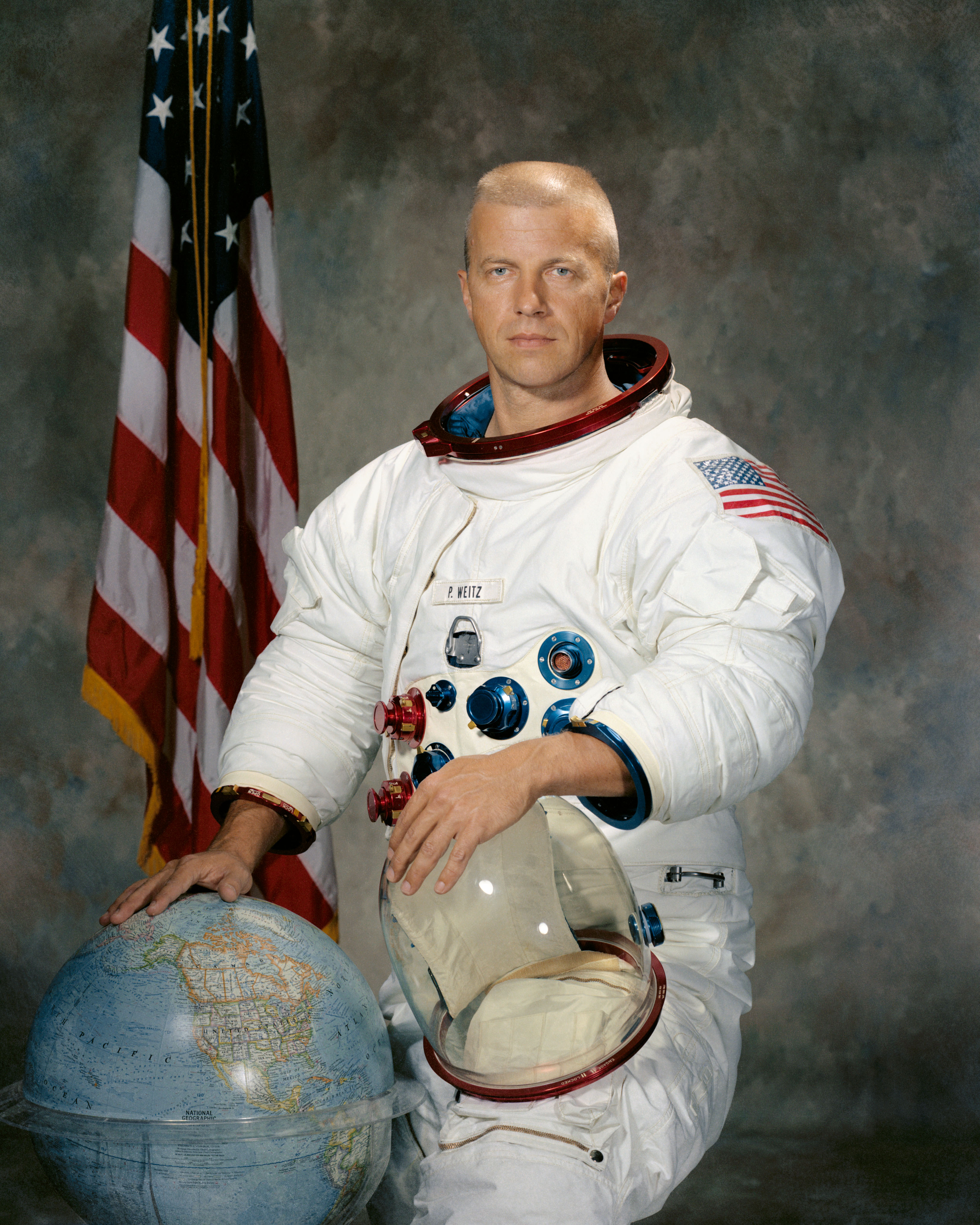
Paul Weitz

Name	Chapter and year	Notability	Ref.
Joseph P. Allen	DePauw 1959	NASA astronaut; mission Specialist for STS-5 mission aboard Columbia and STS-51A mission aboard Discovery	
Kenneth D. Cameron	MIT 1971	Management astronaut; naval aviator-astronaut; Colonel, USMC (Ret.); commander for STS-56 mission aboard Discovery and STS-74 mission aboard Atlantis	
Paul J. Weitz	Penn State 1954	NASA astronaut; naval aviator-astronaut; Captain, USN (Ret.); pilot, Apollo-Skylab 2 (SL-2); commander for STS-6 mission aboard Challenger; deputy director, Lyndon B. Johnson Space Center	

== Business ==
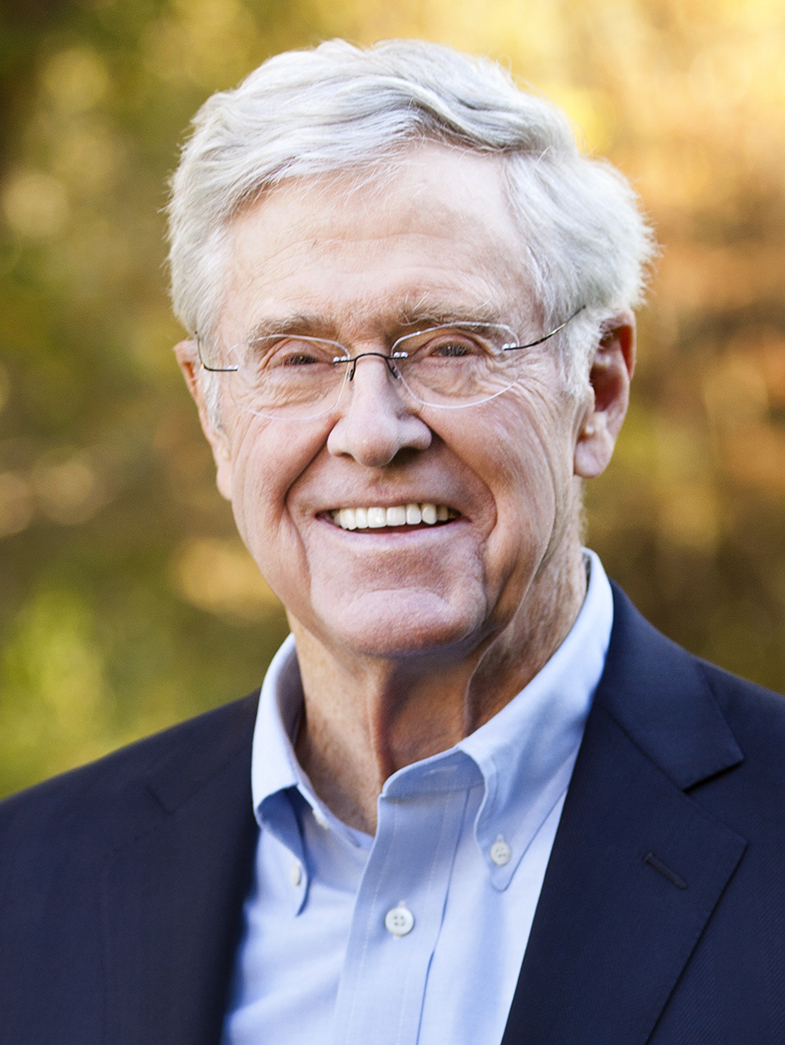
Charles Koch

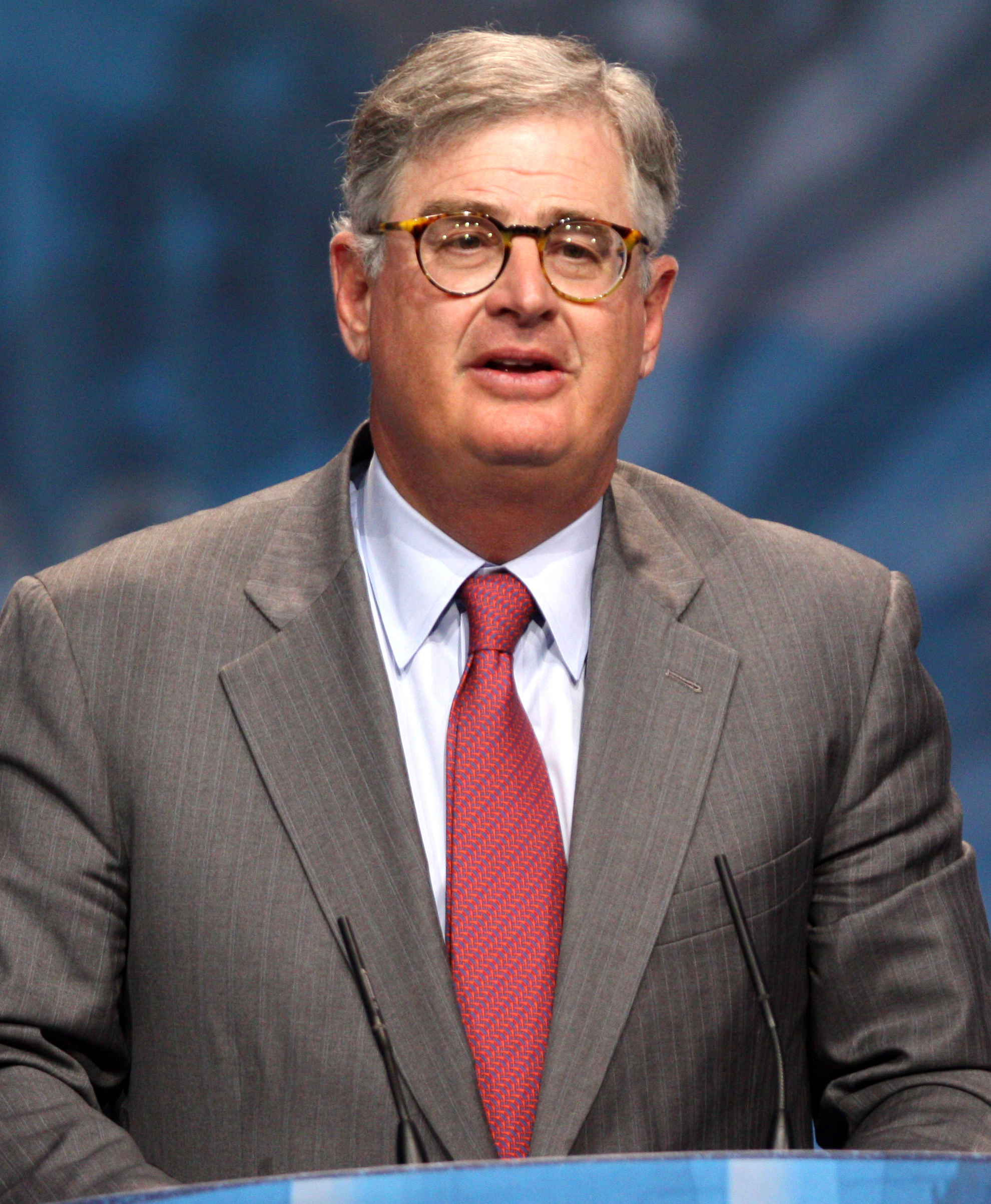
Sam Palmisano

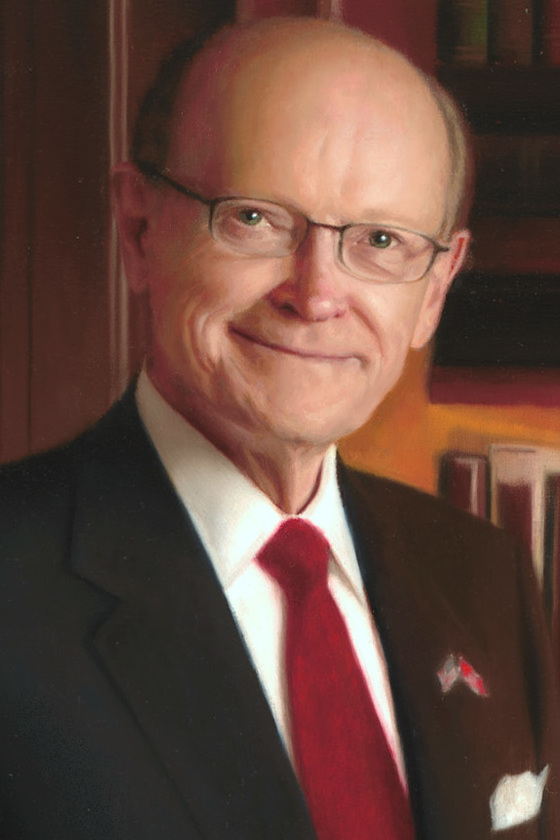
Donald Petersen

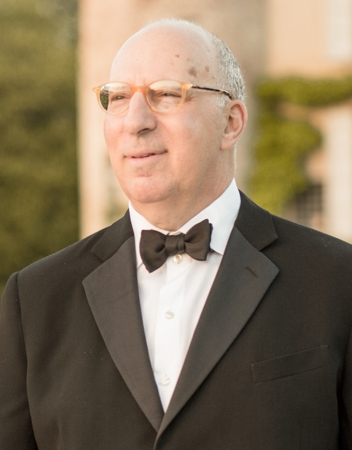
Steven Rales

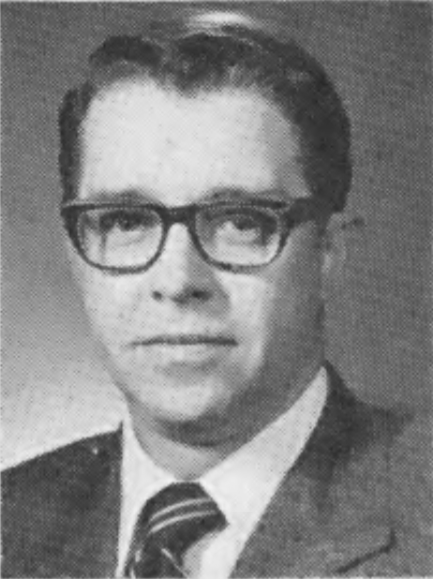
Frank Shrontz

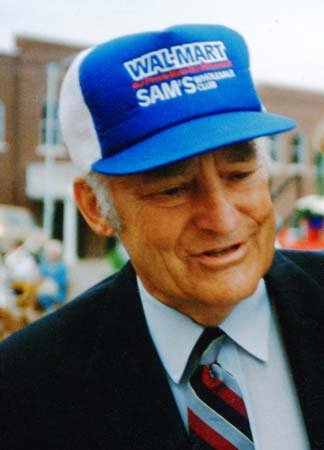
Sam Walton

Name	Chapter and year	Notability	Ref.
John E. Anderson	UCLA 1940	Founder of Topa Equities, Ltd.; namesake of UCLA Anderson School of Management	
Stephen Bechtel Jr.	Colorado/ Purdue 1947	Co-owner of the Bechtel Corporation	
Stephen Bechtel Sr.	California 1923	Chairman and CEO of the Bechtel Group	
Bill Bowerman	Oregon 1933	Founder of Nike, Inc.	
Donald Bren	Washington 1955	Owner of The Irvine Company	
Dan Carney	Wichita State 1953	Co-founder of Pizza Hut	
Douglas Clayton	Cornell 1982	CEO of Leopard Capital	
Arthur D. Collins Jr.	Miami 1969	CEO of Medtronic	
William Cook	Northwestern 1953	Founder of the Cook Group	
David Coulter	Carnegie Mellon 1971	Chairman and CEO of BankAmerica Corporation	
William Jovanovich	Colorado 1941	CEO of Harcourt Brace Jovanovich Publishing	
Ernest Kent Coulter	Ohio State 1892	Founder of Big Brothers Big Sisters of America	
Vincent C. Perini Jr.	Colorado 1920	Petroleum geologist who discovered numerous West Texas oilfields	
Justin Whitlock Dart Sr.	Northwestern 1929	Founder of Dart Industries	
Edward A. Deeds	Denison University 1897	Engineer, inventor, and industrialist	
Chris DeWolfe	Washington 1988	CEO of Myspace.com	
David Duffield	Cornell 1962	President and CEO of PeopleSoft Inc.	
Spencer Eccles	Utah 1956	Financier and chairman emeritus of the Intermountain Region of Wells Fargo Corporation	
William Esrey	Denison 1961	President and CEO of Sprint	
Weldon B. Gibson	Washington State University 1938	Executive at SRI International	
Jeffrey Grayson	Oregon 1964	Investment banker, businessman, and criminal	
William Herbert Hunt	W&L 1951	Investor connected with the silver trading scandal called Silver Thursday	
Joel Hyatt	Dartmouth 1972	Founder of Hyatt Legal Services	
Edgar Kaiser Jr.	Stanford 1965	Chairman of the Bank of British Columbia	
R. Crosby Kemper Jr.	Missouri 1950	President of UMB Financial Corporation	
Charles Koch	MIT 1957	Chairman and CEO of Koch Industries	
David Koch	MIT 1962	Co-owner and executive vice president of Koch Industries	
Alan Ladd Jr.	Southern California	President of United Artists and MGM/UA entertainment	
Kenneth Lay	Missouri 1967	Chairman and CEO of Enron; indicted/convicted on charges related to Enron's financial collapse	
J. Hugh Liedtke	Amherst 1942	Founder of Zapata Corporation and CEO of Pennzoil	
Curt R. Bailey	Colorado 1990	Real estate executive leading major Chicago developments and president of Related Midwest (2008- )	
Conrad Leslie	Miami University 1949	Businessman and crop forecaster	
Alexander F. Mathews	Virginia 1856	Banker and lawyer	
Hugh McColl	North Carolina 1957	Chairman and CEO of Bank of America	
Steve Miller	Southern California 1966	President of Dean Witter Reynolds	
J. C. Nichols	Kansas 1902	Real estate developer	
Daniel Ninivaggi	Columbia 1986	CEO of Lordstown Motors and chairman of Garrett Motion, CEO of Icahn Enterprises and Federal-Mogul	
Blake Nordstrom	Washington 1982	President of Nordstrom	
Bruce Nordstrom	Washington 1955	Chairman and CEO of Nordstrom	
Erik Nordstrom	Washington 1985	Co-president of Nordstrom	
John R. Opel	Westminster 1948	President of IBM	
Charles Lathrop Pack	Television 1878	Timberman and economist	
Samuel J. Palmisano	Johns Hopkins 1973	CEO of IBM	
John Henry Patterson	Miami University 1867	Founder of National Cash Register	
Donald Petersen	Washington 1946	CEO of the Ford Motor Company	
Scott Shellady	Colorado 1988	Commodities trader and financial broadcaster/commentator known as "The Cow Guy"	
Marvin Pierce	Miami University 1916	President of the McCall Corporation; father of Barbara Bush	
Mitchell Rales	Miami University 1978	Co-founder of Danaher Corporation	
Steven Rales	DePauw 1973	Co-founder of Danaher Corporation	
Steven Rogel	Washington 1965	CEO of the Weyerhaeuser Company	
Mortimer L. Schiff	Amherst 1896	Banker and 5th president of the Boy Scouts of America	
Frank Shrontz	Idaho 1953	Chairman and CEO of The Boeing Company	
Jeffrey Skilling	Southern Methodist 1975	CEO of Enron; convicted on charges related to Enron's financial collapse	
Kenneth A. Spencer	Kansas 1921	Founder, president, and CEO of Spencer Chemical Company	
Robert K. Steel	Duke 1973	President and CEO of Wachovia	
G. Kennedy Thompson	North Carolina 1973	CEO of Wachovia, 2000–2008; board member of Hewlett-Packard	
Sam Walton	Missouri 1940	Founder of Wal-Mart	
John Warnock	Utah 1961	Computer scientist who co-founded Adobe Systems Inc	
Fred Wilson	MIT 1983	Venture capitalist and prominent blogger	
Thornton Wilson	Iowa State 1942	Chairman emeritus of The Boeing Company	
Owen D. Young	St. Lawrence 1894	Chairman of General Electric, founder of RCA, co-founder of NBC, and US representative to The Hague conference on reparations who developed the Young Plan	
John Zeglis	University of Illinois 1969	Chairman and CEO of AT&T Wireless	

== Entertainment ==
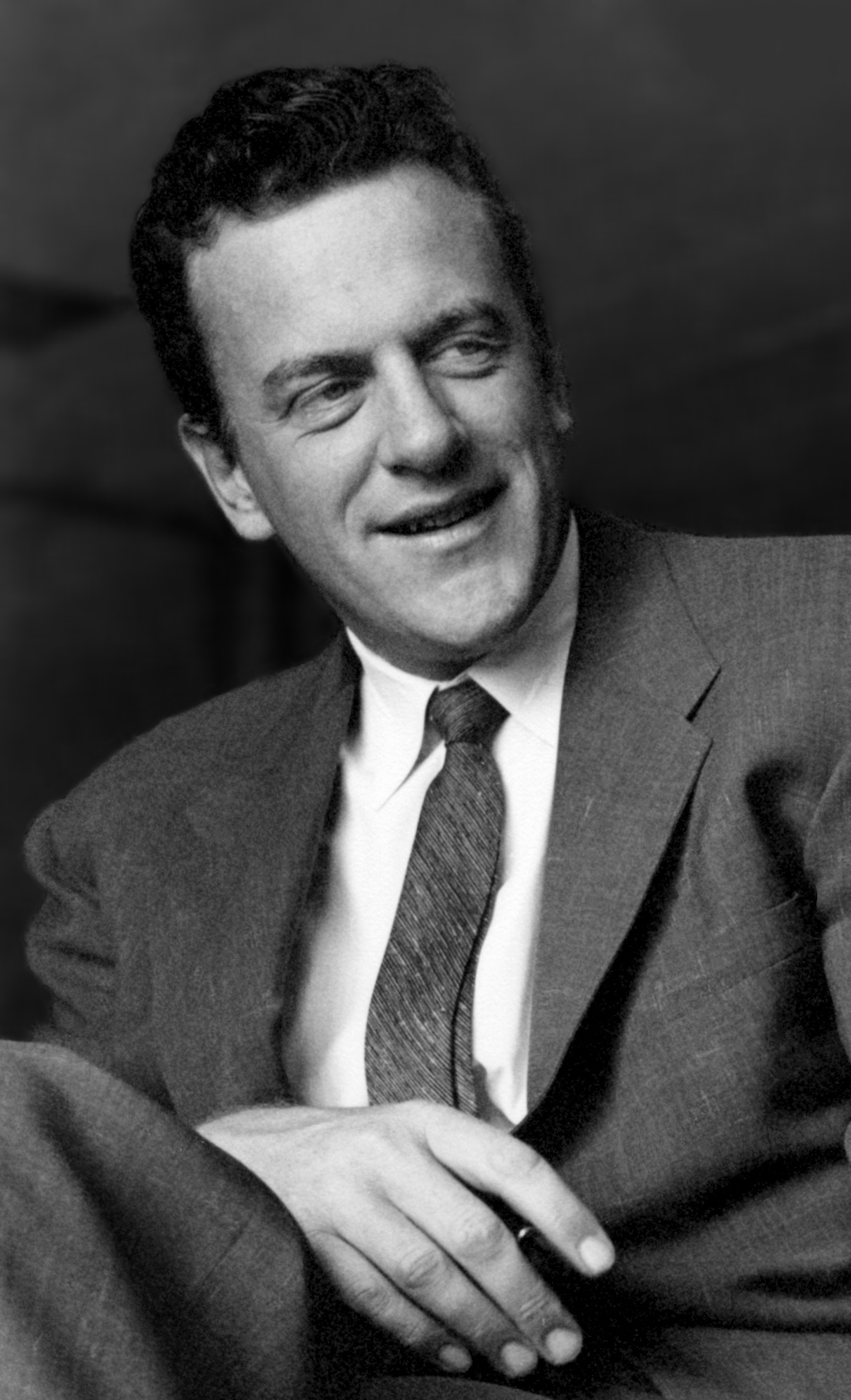
James Arness

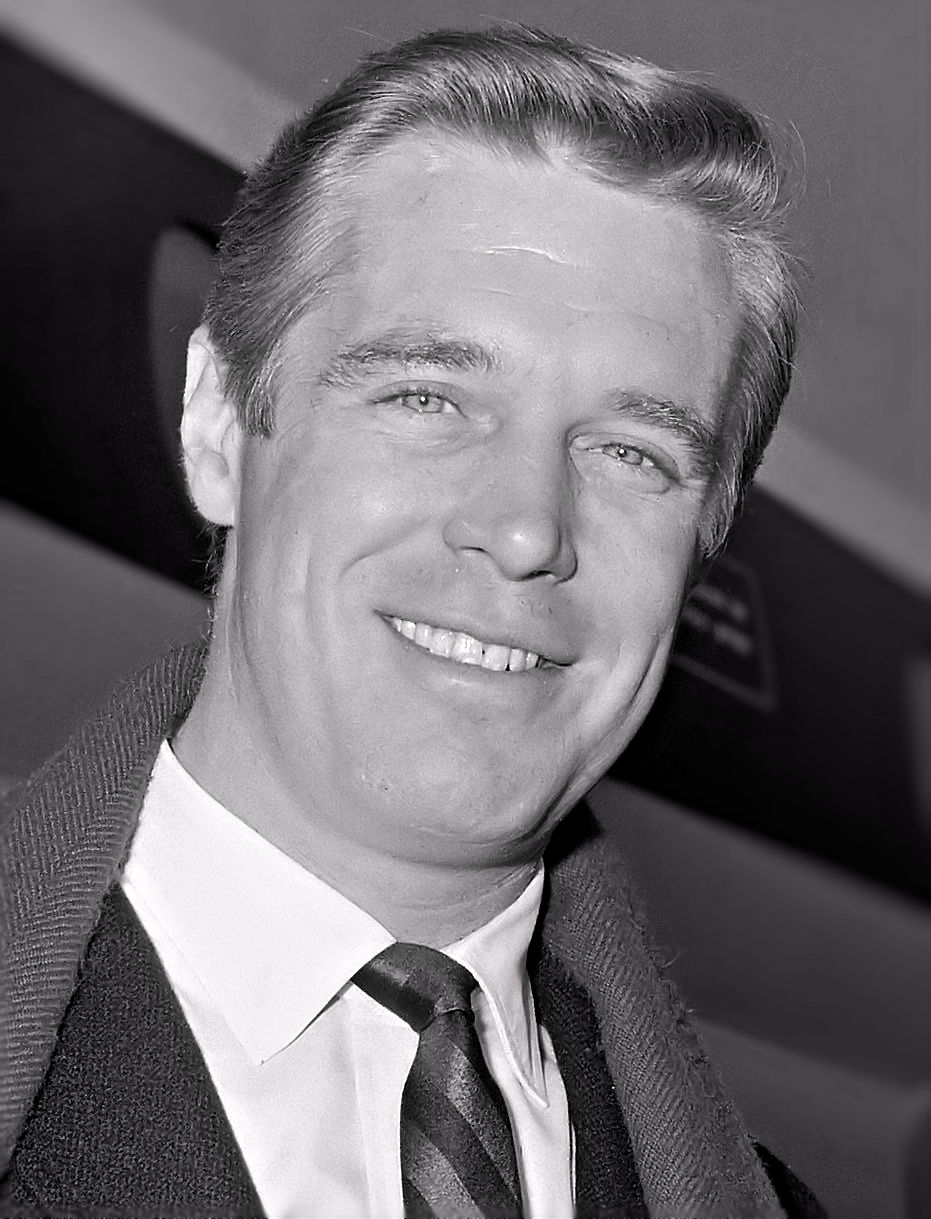
George Peppard

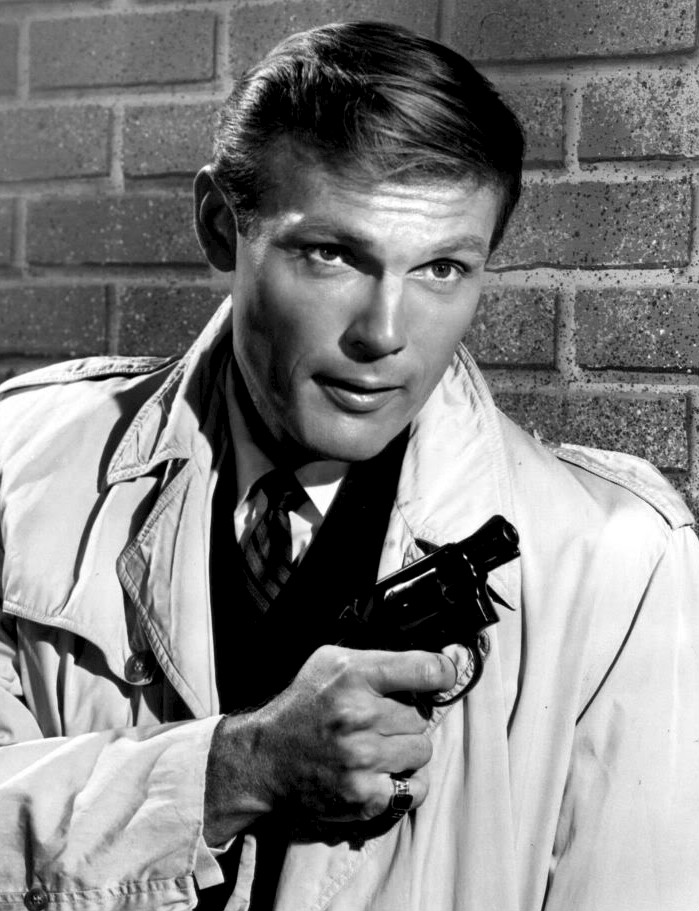
Adam West

Name	Chapter and year	Notability	Ref.
James Arness	Beloit 1946	Actor known for portraying Matt Dillon in the Television series Gunsmoke	
John Backe	Miami 1954	President and CEO of CBS	
Steve Bellamy	Indiana University 1986	Entrepreneur in sports and entertainment known for founding several niche cable Television networks	
Bruce Bennett	Washington 1928	Film and television actor who won the silver medal for the shot put at the 1928 Summer Olympics	
John Boles	Texas 1917	Actor	
Jackson Bostwick	Alabama 1965	Actor known for the Television series Shazam!	
Kyle Brandt	Princeton 2001	Television host, media personality, and actor	
Thom Brennaman	Ohio 1986	Television sportscaster	
Ned Brower	Southern Methodist 1998	Drummer and vocalist in the rock quintet Rooney	
N. Peter Rathvon	Colorado 1915	President of RKO & Producer of 1984	
Phil Brown	Stanford 1937	Actor	
Robert Butler	UCLA 1950	Emmy Award-winning Television director	
Jay Chandrasekhar	Colgate 1990	Actor and film director	
Lloyd Corrigan	UC Berkeley 1922	Actor who appeared in more than 90 films	
John Doman	Pennsylvania 1966	Actor	
Bergen Evans	Miami 1924	Television personality who won a Peabody Award for excellence in broadcasting	
Neil Everett	Willamette 1984	Anchor of SportsCenter	
Chet Forte	Columbia 1957	Television director known for Monday Night Football	
Pat Green	Texas Tech 1995	Country music artist	
Cary Guffey	Florida 1994	Actor known for Close Encounters of the Third Kind	
Leigh Harline	Utah 1929	Film composer and songwriter; won an Academy Award for Best Original Song in 1940 for "When You Wish Upon a Star"	
Kevin Heffernan	Colgate	Actor and a member of the comedy troupe Broken Lizard	
Horace Heidt	UC Berkeley 1924	Pianist, big band leader, and radio and Television personality	
Foster Hewitt	Toronto 1925	Radio broadcaster known for Hockey Night in Canada	
Griffin House	Miami 2002	Singer-songwriter	
Chuck Howard	Duke 1955	Emmy Award-winning producer known for Wide World of Sports	
Sidney Howard	UC Berkeley 1912	Playwright and screenwriter; received a Pulitzer Prize for Drama in 1925 for They Knew What They Wanted and a posthumous Academy Award for Best Adapted Screenplay in 1939 for Gone with the Wind	
Jeffrey Jones	Lawrence 1968	Actor known for Ferris Bueller's Day Off	
Richard Karn	Washington 1978	Actor known for Home Improvement	
Burt Kwouk	Bowdoin 1953	Actor	
Steve Lemme	Colgate	Actor and a member of the comedy troupe Broken Lizard	
Daniel Lindsay	Missouri 2001	Filmmaker known for the Oscar-winning sports documentary Undefeated	
David Lloyd	Colgate 1983	Anchor for SportsCenter	
Pare Lorentz	West Virginia 1926	Filmmaker considered to be the father of the modern documentary	
David Martin	Yale 1965	Television correspondent, journalist, and author for CBS News	
Walter Massey	MIT 1951	Actor	
Les Mayfield	Southern California 1982	Film director known for Encino Man and Blue Streak	
Max Morath	Colorado College 1947	Ragtime pianist and songwriter	
Edward P. Morgan	Whitman 1932	Broadcast journalist for ABC, CBS, and PBS; Peabody Award winner in 1956	
William R. Moses	Wesleyan 1982	Actor known for the 1980s prime-time soap opera Falcon Crest	
Kenyon Nicholson	Wabash 1917	Playwright and screenwriter	
Lance Norris	Whitman 1984	Actor and writer	
Frank Pacelli	Illinois 1948	Emmy Award-winning director known for The Young and the Restless	
George Peppard	Purdue 1952	Actor known for Breakfast at Tiffany's and The A-Team	
Robert Pine	Ohio Wesleyan 1963	Actor known for the television series CHiPs	
Robert Reed	Northwestern 1954	Actor known for The Brady Bunch	
David Richmond-Peck	Western Ontario 1996	Actor who has appeared in over 70 film and Television roles	
Rivers Rutherford	Mississippi 1989	Country music songwriter	
Stephen H. Sholes	Rutgers 1933	Recording executive, producer, and member of the Country Music Hall of Fame	
Jeremy Slate	St. Lawrence 1952	Actor, best known for Hell's Belles (1969), and Hell's Angels '69 (1969)	
Stephen Sondheim	Williams 1950	Composer and lyricist known for Sweeney Todd: The Demon Barber of Fleet Street and West Side Story	
Paul Soter	Colgate	Actor and a member of the comedy troupe Broken Lizard	
Erik Stolhanske	Colgate 1991	Actorand a member of the comedy troupe Broken Lizard	
Jess Thomas	Nebraska 1948	Operatic tenor	
Erland Van Lidth De Jeude	MIT 1976	Dutch-American actor, opera singer	
Doodles Weaver	Stanford 1937	Character actor, comedian, and musician who hosted The Doodles Weaver Show	
Robb Weller	Washington 1972	Television personality and game show host known for Entertainment Tonight and Win, Lose or Draw	
Adam West	Whitman 1951	Actor known for Batman and Family Guy	
Brian J. White	Dartmouth	Actor known for Stomp the Yard	
Robert Wilson	Texas 1963	Playwright, Obie Award winner for direction, and Olivier Award winner for Best New Opera	
Christopher Woodrow	Alabama 1999	Hollywood movie producer known for Birdman, Black Mass, and Hacksaw Ridge	
Paul Worley	Vanderbilt 1972	Record producer who discovered the Dixie Chicks and produced the Grammy Award-winning album Own the Night for Lady Antebellum	

== Law ==
Name	Chapter and year	Notability	Ref.
Francis W. H. Adams	Williams 1925	US Attorney for the Southern District of New York and New York City Police Commissioner	
Herschel W. Arant	Yale 1911	Judge of the United States Court of Appeals for the Sixth Circuit and former dean of the Ohio State University Moritz College of Law	
Virgil Bouldin	Cumberland 1889	Justice of the Supreme Court of Alabama and Alabama House of Representatives	
David J. Brewer	Wesleyan 1955	Justice of the Supreme Court of the United States	
Charles Colson	Brown 1953	Special Counsel to President Richard M. Nixon; indicted/convicted Watergate conspirator	
George A. Cooke	Knox 1892	Illinois General Assembly, and chief justice of the Illinois Supreme Court	
Chuck Douglas	Wesleyan 1964	New Hampshire Supreme Court Associate Justice and US House of Representatives from New Hampshire	
Harry E. Pratt	Colorado 1909	Justice of the Alaska Territorial District Court from 1935 to 1954	
William O. Douglas	Whitman 1920	Justice of the Supreme Court of the United States	
Fred Gause	Indiana 1900	Justice of the Indiana Supreme Court	
Charles Harold Haden II	Oklahoma 1956	US Federal Judge	
Frank Herbert Hall	Colorado College 1916	Chief justice of Colorado Supreme Court	
John Marshall Harlan	Centre 1850	Justice of the Supreme Court of the United States	
Frank Hogan	Columbia 1924	New York County District Attorney	
Newell Jennings	Yale 1904	Justice of the Connecticut Supreme Court	
Edwin (Ned) P. Van Cise	Colorado 1937	Colorado Court of Appeals Judge	
Joseph Rucker Lamar	Bethany 1877	Justice of the Supreme Court of the United States	
Stephen N. Limbaugh Sr.	Missouri 1951	Judge on the US District Court for the Eastern District of Missouri	
Horace Harmon Lurton	Cumberland 1867	Justice of the Supreme Court of the United States	
Samuel Taylor Marshall	Ohio 1839	Attorney and co-founder of Beta Theta Pi	
Emlin McClain	Iowa 1873	Chief justice of the Iowa Supreme Court	
Warren Olney Jr.	UC Berkeley 1894	Associate justice of the Supreme Court of California	
Ralph O. Olson	Carleton 1922	Washington Supreme Court justice	
William Robinson Pattangall	Maine 1884	Chief Justice of the Maine Supreme Judicial Court, Maine Attorney General, and Maine House of Representatives	
John Josiah Robinette	Toronto 1926	Canadian lawyer and litigator	
John Sopinka	Toronto 1958	Puisne Justice, Supreme Court of Canada	
Edwin K. Steers	Indiana 1937	Indiana Attorney General	
Kimbrough Stone	Missouri 1895	Judge of the US Circuit Court of Appeals, Eighth Circuit	
Bryant Smith	Colorado 1916	Legal scholar and renowned professor best known for Legal Personality (1928)	
Dickran Tevrizian	Southern California 1962	First Armenian-American U.S. Federal Judge	
Ralph Gordon Thompson	Oklahoma 1956	US Federal Judge	
Willis Van Devanter	DePauw 1881	Justice of the Supreme Court of the United States	
Harold J. Warner	Oregon 1909	Chief Justice of the Oregon Supreme Court	
William Burnham Woods	Western Reserve 1841	Justice of the Supreme Court of the United States	

== Literature and journalism ==
Name	Chapter and year	Notability	Ref.
Bert Andrews	Stanford 1925	Washington-based reporter for the New York Herald Tribune who won a Pulitzer Prize	
James Batten	Davidson 1957	Journalist and CEO of Knight Ridder	
James O'Donnell Bennett	Michigan 1893	Journalist known for writing for the Chicago Tribune and the Chicago Record-Herald	
Main Bocher	Chicago 1911	Fashion designer and editor-in-chief of the French edition of Vogue	
Percy Jewett Burrell	Boston 1897	Dramatist and playwright	
Byron Calame	Missouri 1961	Journalist and deputy managing editor of The Wall Street Journal	
Mark Divine	Colgate 1985	Author and retired Navy SEAL Commander	
Dick Durrell	Minnesota 1950	Publisher of People magazine	
Howard Fineman	Colgate 1970	Journalist and Television commentator; global editorial director of the AOL Huffington Post Media Group	
Bobby E. Lorton III	Colorado ex'1991	Newspaper publisher, founder of nonprofit investigative newsroom, and president of World Publishing Company (1997-2013)	
George Fitch	Knox College 1897	Author and journalist	
William Harrison Fetridge	Northwestern 1930	Maritime writer, vice-president of Popular Mechanics, and president of the Dartnell Corporation	
Sam Walter Foss	Brown 1882	Poet known for The House by the Side of the Road and The Coming American	
David Hirshey	Dickinson 1971	Book editor who served as senior vice president and executive editor of HarperCollins	
Richard Hooker	Bowdoin 1945	Writer and surgeon known for his novel MASH	
L. D. Hotchkiss	Iowa Wesleyan / Iowa 1916	Newspaper journalist who served as editor-in-chief of the Los Angeles Times	
Kermit Hunter	Ohio 1931	Author and playwright	
Russell Janney	Yale 1906	Theatrical producer and author known for his 1946 best-selling novel The Miracle of the Bells, which was made into a film of the same name in 1948	
Laird Koenig	Washington 1949	Author	
Ken Kesey	Oregon 1957	Author known for his 1962 novel One Flew Over the Cuckoo's Nest	
Alva A. Paddock	Colorado 1916	Publisher of the Boulder Daily Camera (1940–61) and founder of Boulder Historical Society	
David Lamb	Maine 1962	Los Angeles Times correspondent	
Charles Wesley Leffingwell	Knox College	Editor of The Living Church magazine	
Norman Maclean	Dartmouth 1924	Author known for his 1976 novel A River Runs Through It, which was made into an Academy Award-winning film of the same name in 1992	
Karl Marlantes	Yale 1967	Author known for the novel Matterhorn: A Novel of the Vietnam War	
Thomas Franklin Fairfax Millard	Missouri 1888	Journalist and newspaper editor; founder of the China Weekly Review and author of seven influential books on the Far East	
Harry Allen Overstreet	California 1899	Writer and author known for the best-selling book The Mature Mind	
Donald R. Avoy	Colorado 1961	Author	
Albert Shaw	Johns Hopkins 1884	Journalist who was the founder and editor of The American Review of Reviews	
Bob Thomas	UCLA 1943	Hollywood reporter for the Associated Press	
Frederick N. Ward	Florida 1957	Photojournalist	

== Military ==
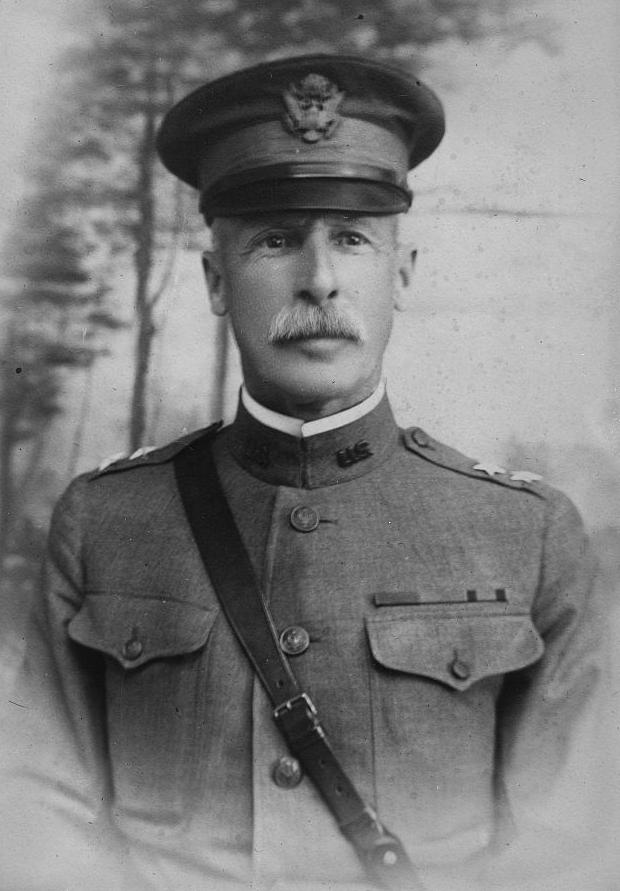
Omar Bundy

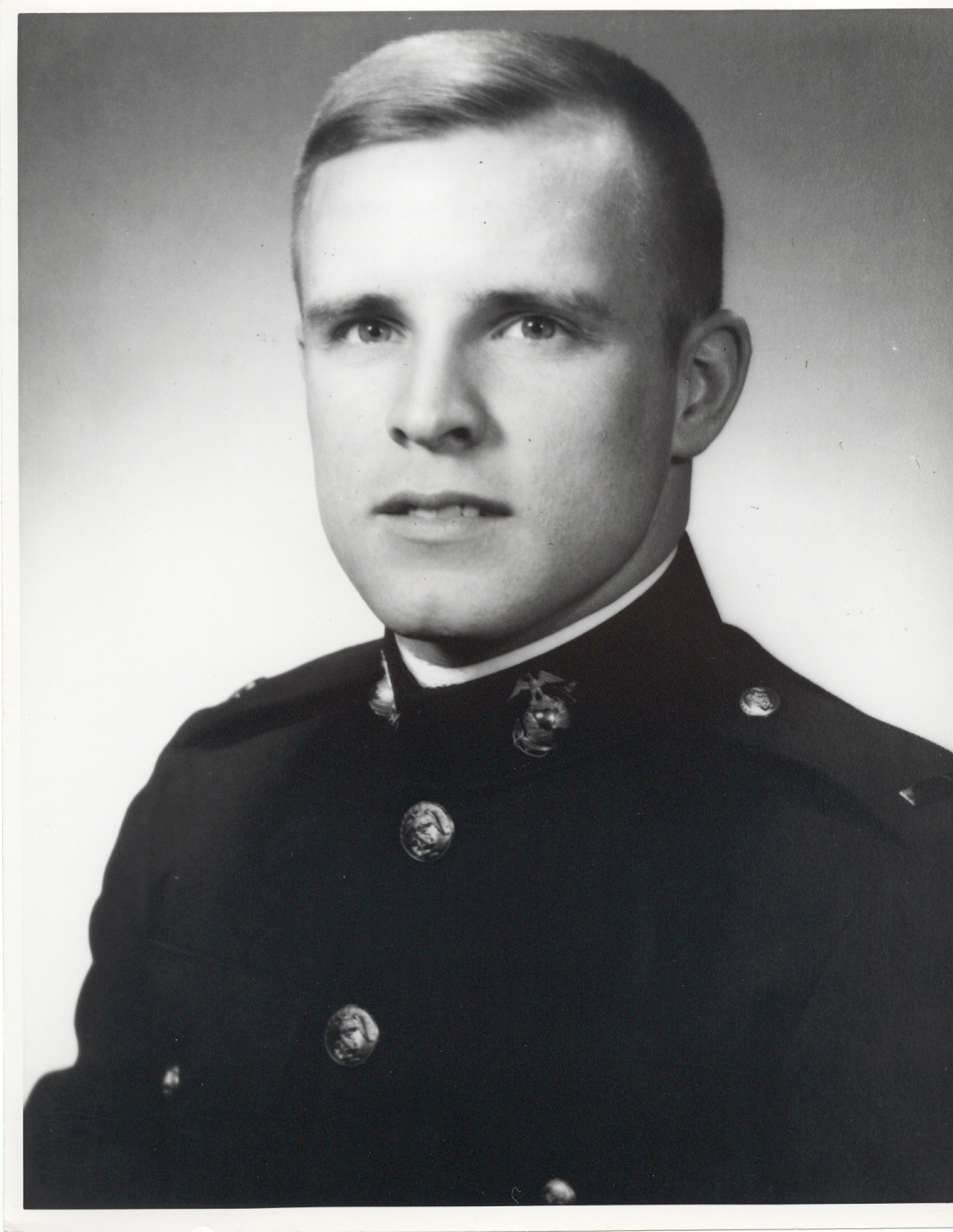
Terrence Graves

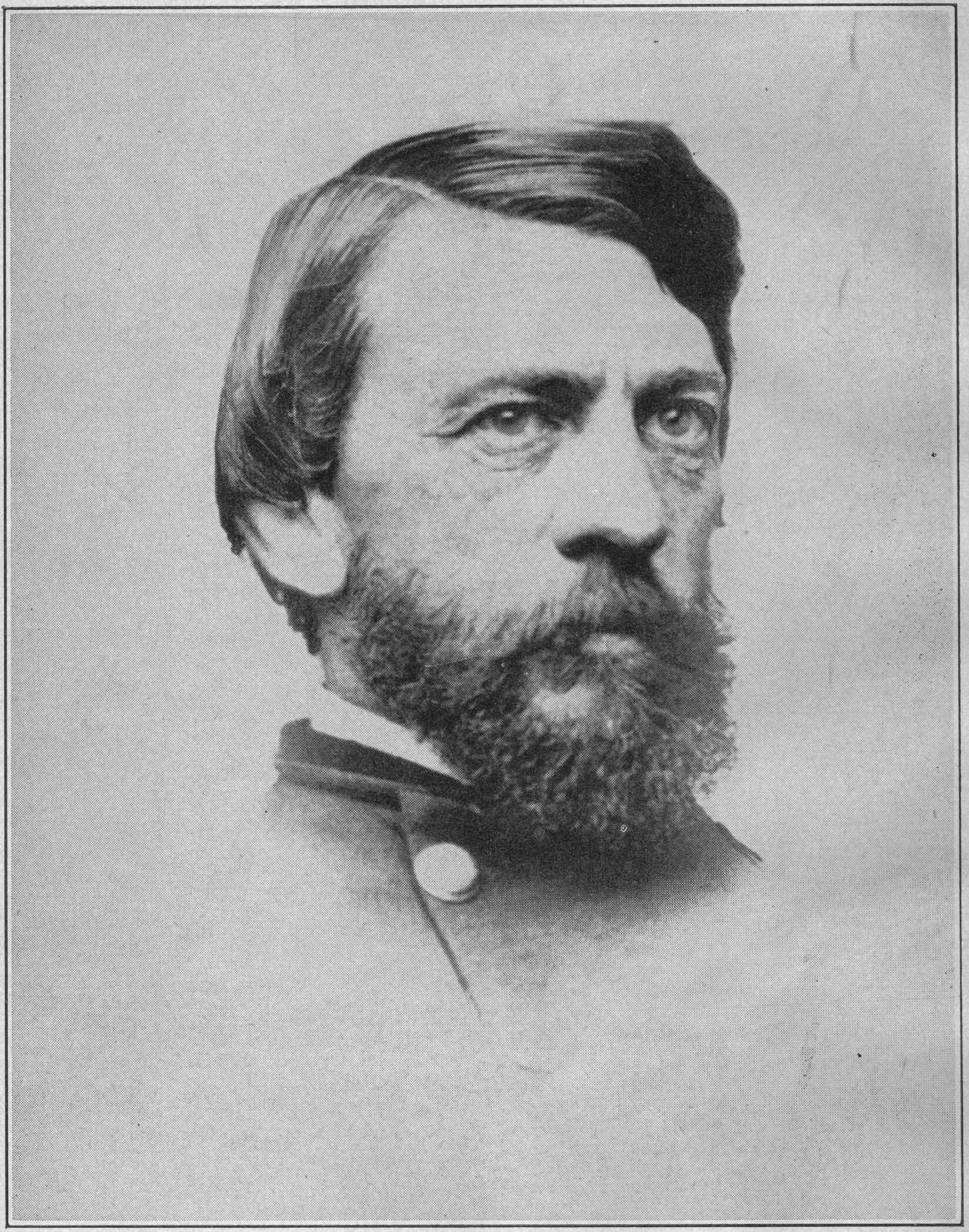
Jonathan Letterman

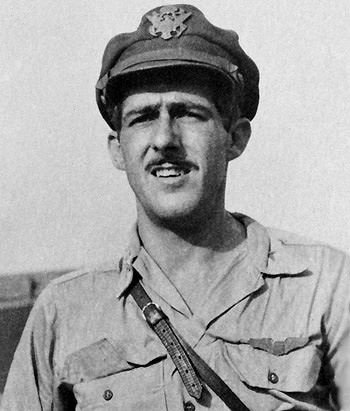
Thomas McGuire

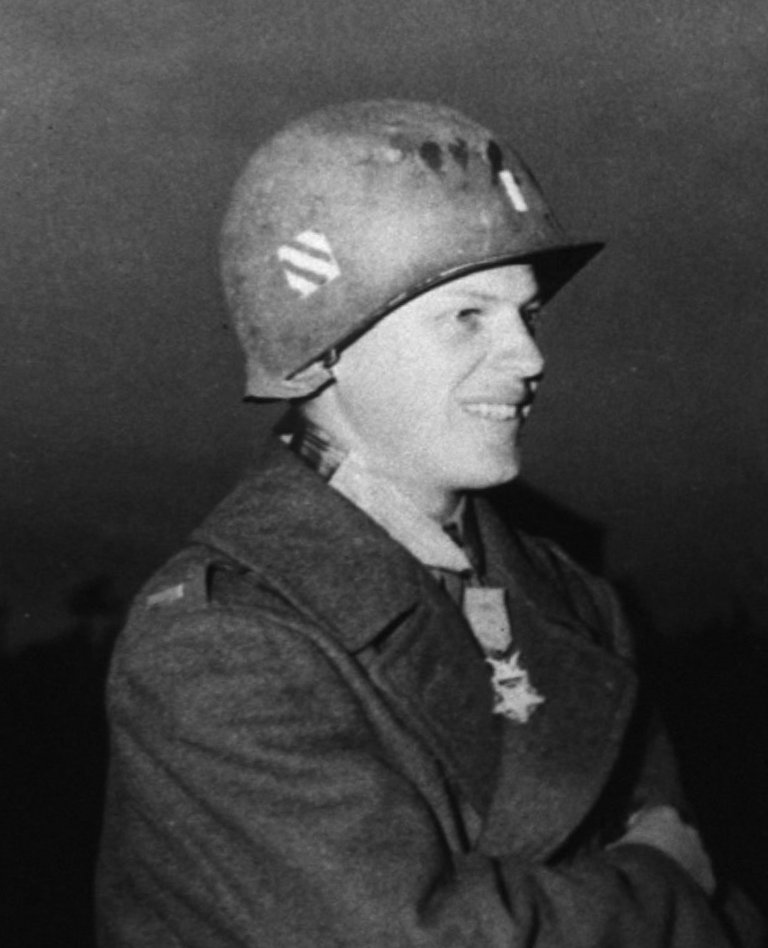
David Waybur

Name	Chapter and year	Notability	Ref.
George M. Browning Jr.	UCLA 1952	Lieutenant General, US Air Force (Ret.); Command Pilot; fighter pilot (F-86 Sabre, F-102 Delta Dagger, F-4 Phantom II); commander, 26th Tactical Reconnaissance Wing; Comptroller of the Air Force	
Omar Bundy	DePauw 1881	Major General, US Army (Ret.), initiated counter-attack that saved Paris from impending capture by the Germans in World War I; namesake of USS General Omar Bundy (AP-152)	
Enoch Crowder	Missouri 1887	Major General, US Army; Judge Advocate General of the US Army; US Army Provost Marshall General; oversaw the drafting and administration of the Selective Service Act of 1917; US Ambassador to Cuba	
Eric Erickson	Cornell 1921	Swedish national who served as an intelligence agent for the US Office of Strategic Services during World War II	
Everett S. Huntington	Colorado 1918	Naval civil engineer who supported Allied wartime logistics	
Terrence C. Graves	Miami 1967	2nd Lieutenant, US Marine Corps, infantry officer, 3rd Force Reconnaissance Company; Medal of Honor recipient (posthumous) during Vietnam War	
James Wallace Haverfield	Ohio State 1939	Ensign, US Naval Reserve; killed aboard the battleship USS Arizona (BB-39) during the 1941 Japanese attack on Pearl Harbor; namesake of USS Haverfield (DE-393)	
Joe W. Kelly	DePauw 1931	General, US Air Force (Ret.); attended DePauw 1927–28, then transferred to U.S. Military Academy, class of 1932; Command Pilot; Martin B-26 Marauder bomber pilot and Commander of 386th Bomb Group (Medium) during World War II; later commanded various Strategic Air Command bomber units; first four-star Commander of Military Air Transport Service in the 1960s, to include during the 1962 Cuban Missile Crisis	
Jonathan Letterman	Washington & Jefferson 1845	Major and surgeon, Union Army/Army of the Potomac; medical director of the Army of the Potomac during the Civil War; known as the "father of battlefield medicine"; namesake of the Letterman Army Medical Center, now the Letterman Digital Arts Center at the Presidio of San Francisco	
James Rogers McConnell	Virginia 1910	Sergeant and fighter pilot with the Lafayette Escadrille	
Thomas McGuire	Georgia Tech 1944	Major, US Army Air Forces fighter pilot and World War II aerial fighter ace (second highest scoring US ace of WW II); posthumous recipient of the Medal of Honor; namesake of McGuire Air Force Base (now Joint Base McGuire-Dix-Lakehurst)	
Emory Jenison Pike	Iowa Wesleyan 1899	Lieutenant Colonel, US Army; infantry officer; Medal of Honor recipient (posthumous) during World War I; the only West Point graduate to be awarded the Medal of Honor during World War I	
Everett P. Pope	Bowdoin 1941	Major, US Marine Corps; Medal of Honor recipient during World War II	
William B. Rosson	Oregon 1940	General, US Army (Ret.), Combat Infantryman, recipient of the Distinguished Service Cross for valor during the invasion of Anzio in World War II; deputy commander of US Military Assistance Command, Vietnam; commander in chief, US Southern Command	
John T. Thompson	Indiana 1881	Brigadier General, US Army (Ret.), artillery officer and ordnance officer; inventor of the Thompson submachine gun	
David C. Waybur	UC Berkeley 1942	1st Lieutenant, US Army, Medal of Honor recipient; killed in action in Germany, 28 Mar 1945, two years after the action which earned him the MOH; recipient of the Silver Star and the Purple Heart	

== Politics ==
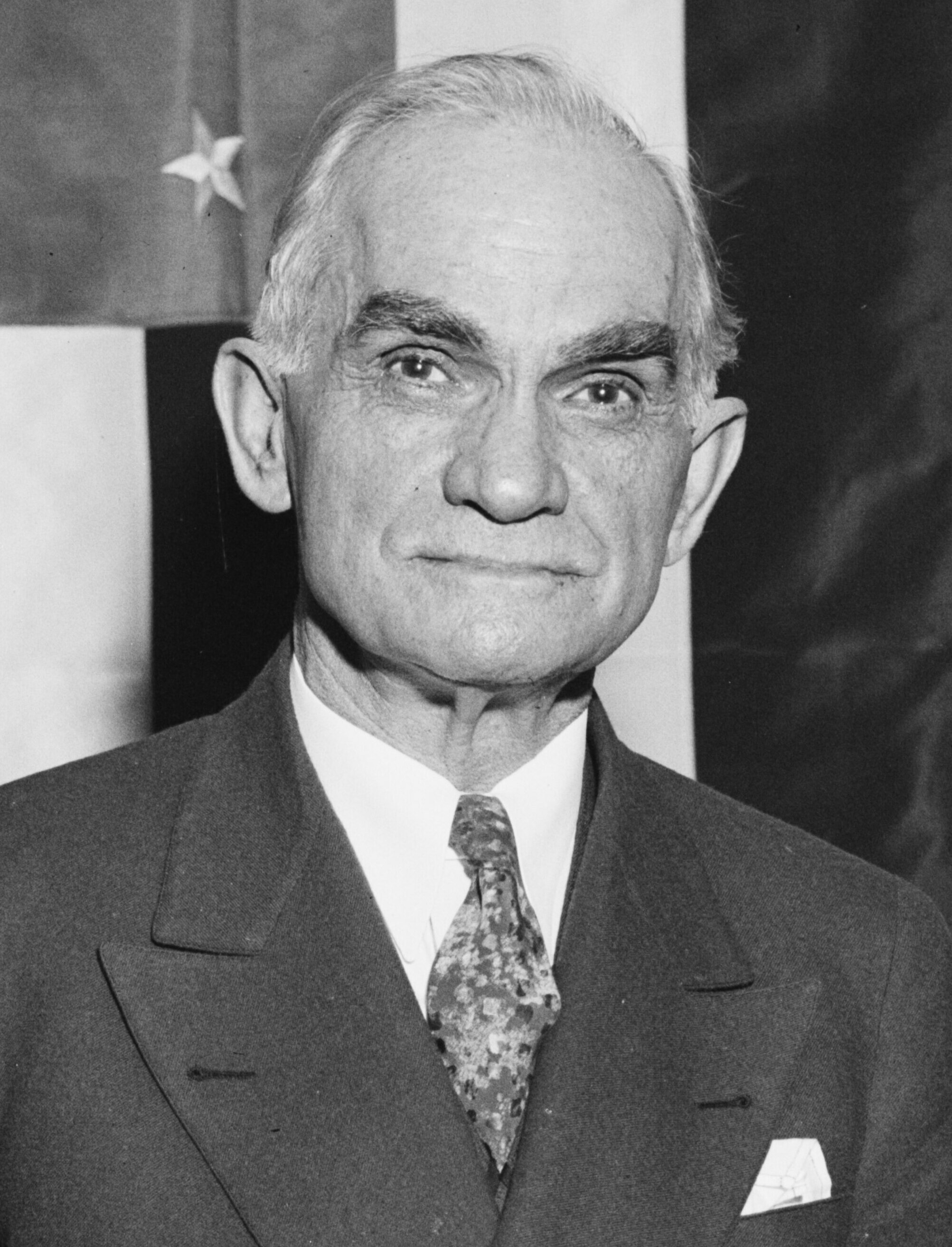
Joseph Byrns

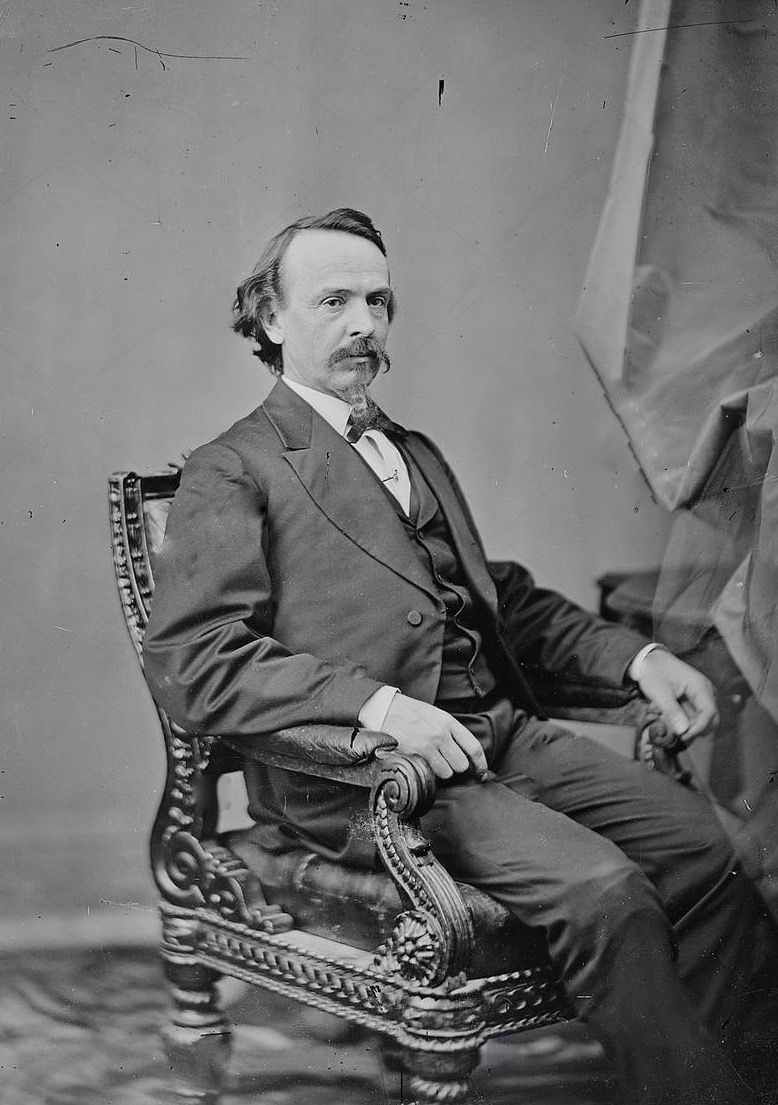
John Coburn

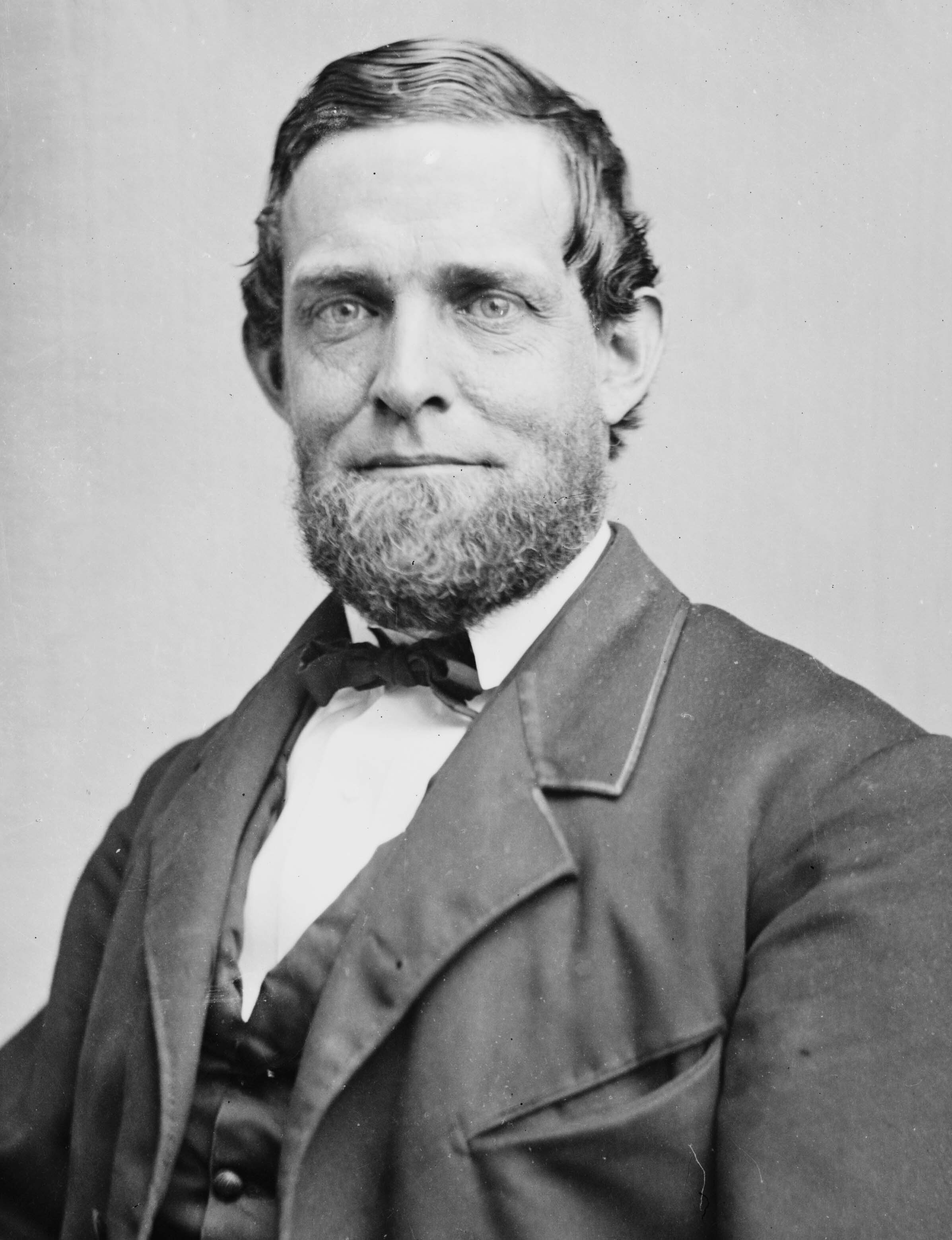
Schuyler Colfax

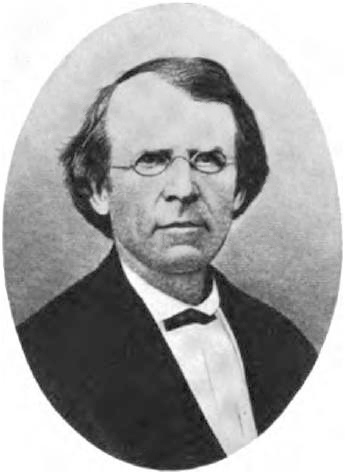
Charles Henry Hardin

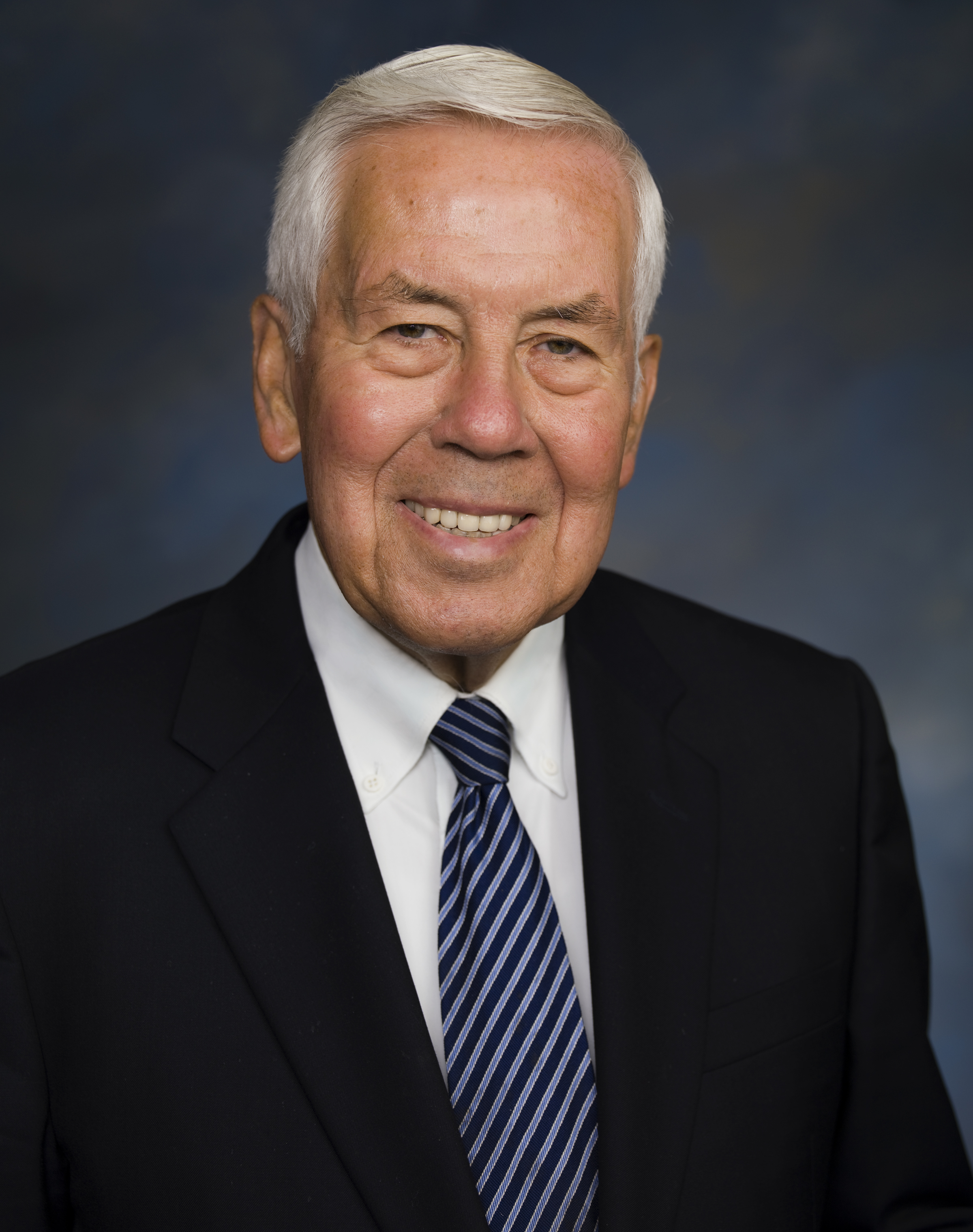
Richard Lugar

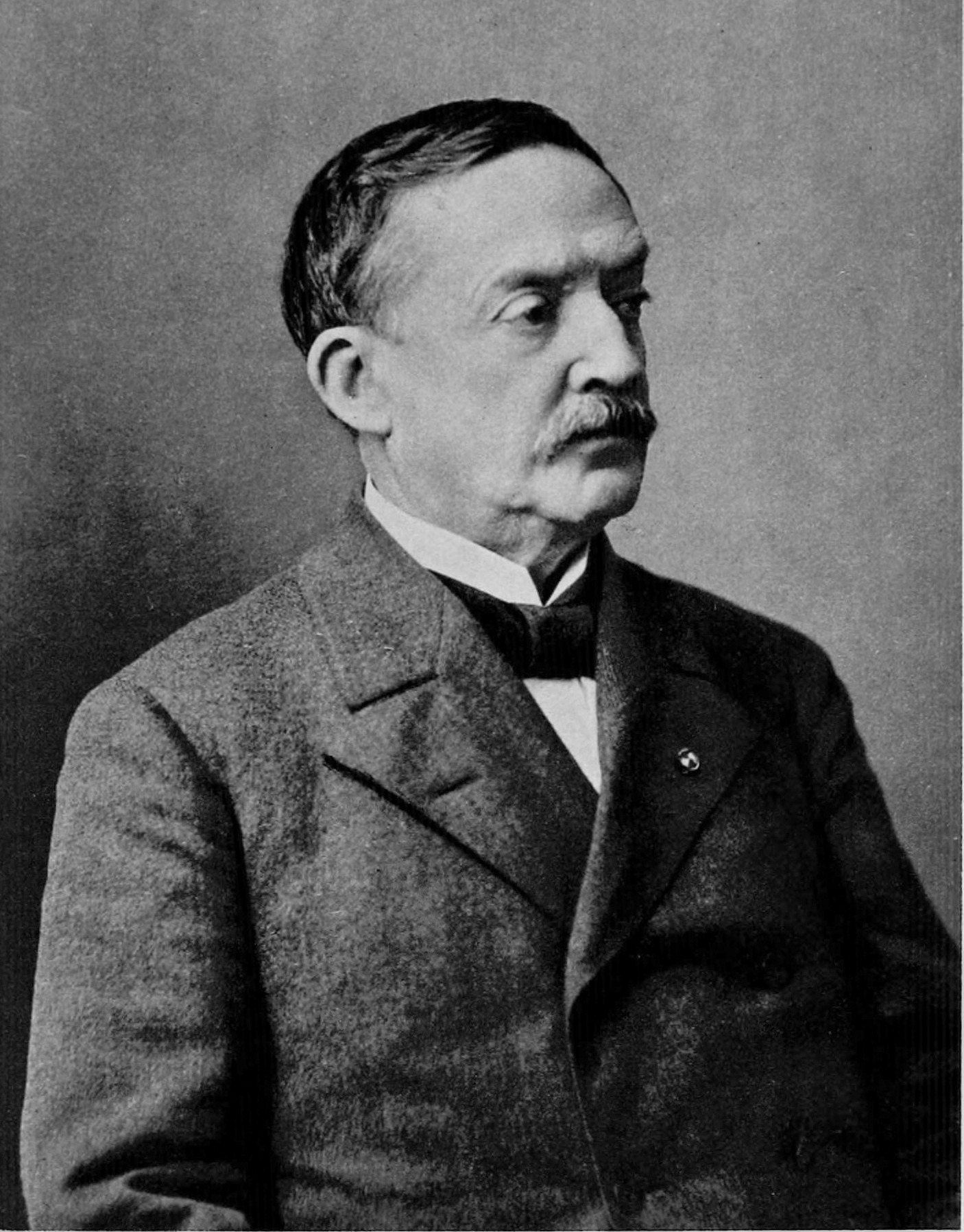
Matt Quay

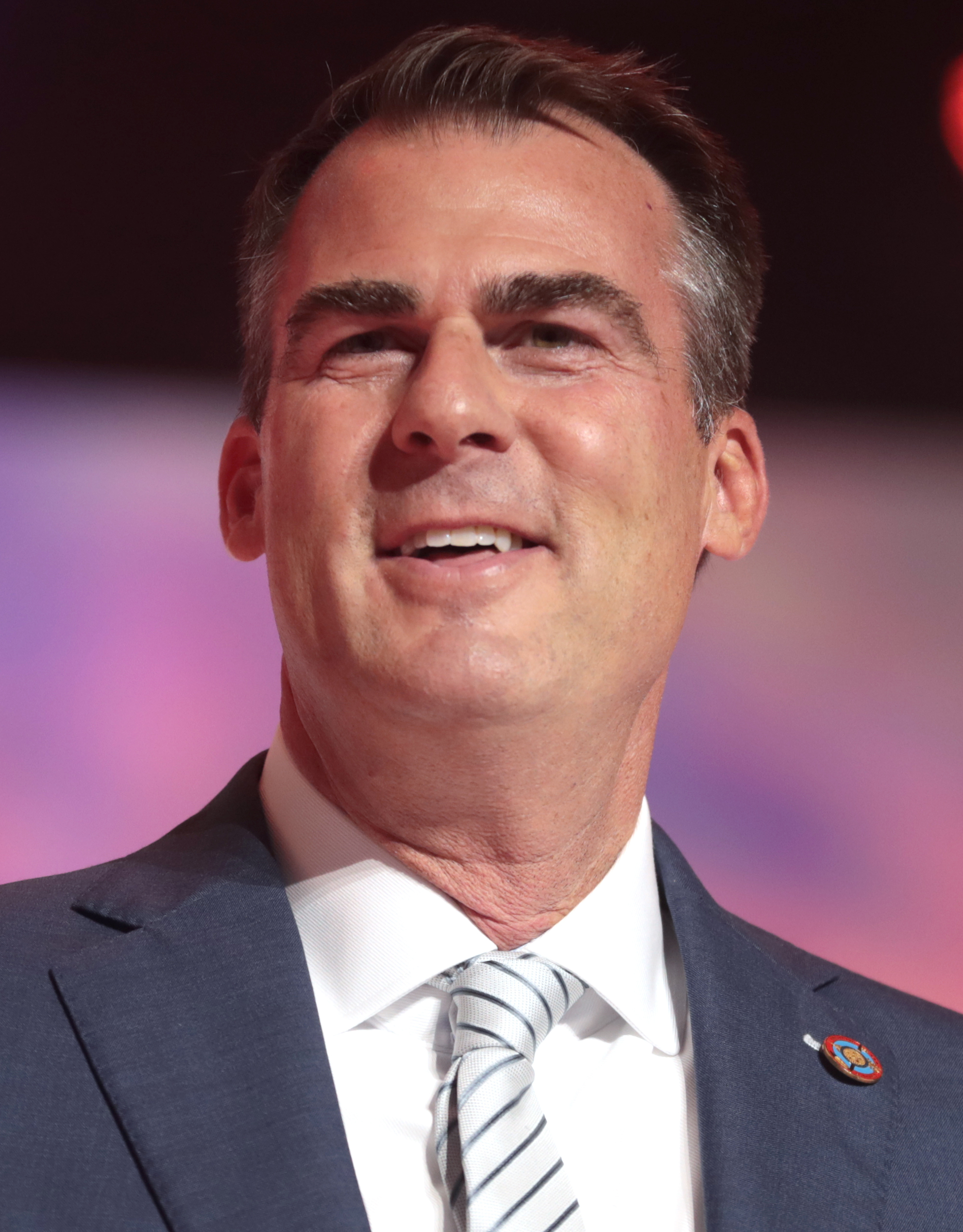
Kevin Stitt

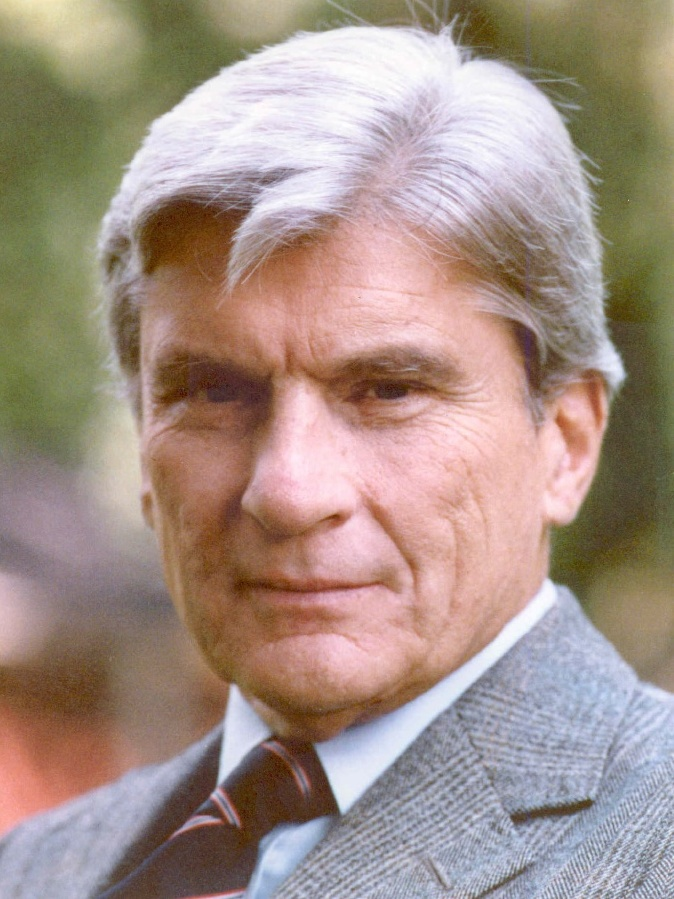
John Warner

Name	Chapter and year	Notability	Ref.
Theodore C. Achilles	Stanford 1925	US Ambassador to Peru	
Joe Allbaugh	Oklahoma State 1974	Director of the Federal Emergency Management Agency	
John Mills Allen	Cumberland 1869	US House of Representatives from Mississippi	
A. Piatt Andrew	Wabash 1892	US House of Representatives from Massachusetts	
William Hepburn Armstrong	Princeton 1847	US House of Representatives from Pennsylvania	
Owen Aspinall	Denison 1949	Governor of American Samoa	
Wayne N. Aspinall	Denver 1919	US House of Representatives from Colorado, Colorado House of Representatives, Colorado Senate	
Charles Montague Bakewell	California 1889	US House of Representatives from Connecticut and Connecticut State Senate	
George Thomas Barnes	Georgia 1853	US House of Representatives from Georgia	
Lewis O. Barrows	Maine 1916	Governor of Maine and Secretary of State of Maine	
John R. Schram	Western Ontario ’62 / Toronto ’65	Canadian diplomat, ambassador, and high commissioner to Ghana	
John L. Bates	Boston 1882	Governor of Massachusetts and Speaker of the Massachusetts House of Representatives	
Albert I. Beach	Kansas 1905	Mayor of Kansas City, Missouri	
James Andrew Beall	Texas 1890	US House of Representatives from Texas	
James A. Beaver	Washington and Jefferson 1856	Governor of Pennsylvania	
James T. Begg	Wooster 1903	US House of Representatives from Ohio	
Charles E. Bennett	Colorado 1938	Colorado state representative 1948-50, Colorado state senator 1958-60, and Colorado Superior Court judge 1960-1981.	
Michael Bennet	Wesleyan 1987	US Senator from Colorado	
Thomas W. Bennett	DePauw 1855	US House of Representatives from Idaho and Governor of Idaho Territory	
Ami Bera	UC Irvine 1987	US House of Representatives from California	
Albert S. Berry	Miami 1856	US House of Representatives from Kentucky	
Richard W. Blue	Washington and Jefferson 1864	US House of Representatives from Kansas	
Hale Boggs	Tulane 1935	US House of Representatives from Louisiana	
Newton Booth	DePauw 1846	US Senator from California and Governor of California	
William Borah	Kansas 1884	US Senator from Idaho	
Henry Sherman Boutell	Iowa 1873	US House of Representatives from North Dakota, Minister Plenipotentiary to Portugal, and Minister Plenipotentiary to Switzerland	
Emmett Forest Branch	Indiana 1896	Governor of Indiana	
Louis J. Brann	Maine 1898	Governor of Maine, Maine House of Representatives, and Mayor of Lewiston, Maine	
Donald G. Brotzman	Colorado 1943	US House of Representatives from Colorado, Colorado House of Representatives, and United States Attorney for Colorado	
Dean T. Prosser	Colorado 1939	Wyoming House of Representatives (1971–1982)	
Frank H. Means	Colorado 1908	Colorado state senator (1915–1918) and University of Colorado regent	
William L. Paddock	Colorado 1943	Colorado House of Representatives, representing Boulder County (1948–50)	
Charles Hillman Brough	Johns Hopkins 1898	Governor of Arkansas	
B. Gratz Brown	Transylvania 1846	US Senator from Kentucky	
John Young Brown	Centre 1855	US House of Representatives from Kentucky and Governor of Kentucky	
Norris Brown	Iowa 1883	US Senator from Nebraska	
Webster E. Brown	Wisconsin 1874	US House of Representatives from Wisconsin	
George Inness Gay	Colorado 1907	American humanitarian relief administrator who worked with Herbert Hoover	
Henry Augustus Buchtel	DePauw 1872	Governor of Colorado	
George S. Buck	Yale 1896	Mayor of Buffalo, New York	
Joseph R. Burton	Hanover 1873	US Senator from Kansas	
John Marshall Butler	Johns Hopkins 1921	US Senator from Maryland	
William D. Bynum	Indiana 1869	US House of Representatives from Indiana	
Jo Byrns	Vanderbilt 1890	US House of Representatives from Tennessee and Speaker of the US House of Representatives	
Courtney W. Campbell		US House of Representatives from Florida	
Ezekial Samuel Candler Jr.	Mississippi 1881	US House of Representatives from Mississippi	
Rush Clark	Washington and Jefferson 1853	US House of Representatives from Iowa	
Frank G. Clarke	Dartmouth 1873	US House of Representatives from New Hampshire	
Cassius Marcellus Clay	Yale 1918	Kentucky House of Representatives, and Kentucky Senate	
Isaac Clements	DePauw 1859	US House of Representatives from Illinois	
John Coburn	Wabash 1846	United States Representative from Indiana, Associate Justice of Montana Territorial Supreme Court, Secretary of the Territory of Montana, and Brigadier General in the United States Army	
Schuyler Colfax	DePauw 1854	Vice President of the United States, US House of Representatives from Indiana; Speaker of the US House of Representatives	
Daniel Webster Comstock	Ohio Wesleyan 1860	US House of Representatives from Indiana	
John Sherman Cooper	Centre 1923	US Senator from Kentucky; US Ambassador to India, US Ambassador to Nepal, and US Ambassador to West Germany	
Norris Henry Cotton	Wesleyan 1923	US Senator from New Hampshire, US House of Representatives from New Hampshire, and Speaker of the New Hampshire House of Representatives	
William S. Cowherd	Missouri 1881	US House of Representatives from Missouri and Mayor of Kansas City, Missouri	
William B. Cravens	Missouri 1893	US House of Representatives from Arkansas	
Thomas T. Crittenden Jr.	Missouri 1882	Mayor of Kansas City, Missouri	
George W. Cromer	Indiana 1882	US House of Representatives from Indiana	
Charles N. Crosby	Western Reserve 1897	US House of Representatives from Pennsylvania	
Enoch Crowder	Missouri 1886	US Ambassador to Cuba	
Lee Cruce	Vanderbilt 1885	Governor of Oklahoma	
William Cumback	DePauw 1853	US House of Representatives from Indiana and Lieutenant Governor of Indiana	
John A. Danaher	Yale 1920	US Senator from Connecticut, judge of United States Court of Appeals for the District of Columbia Circuit, and Secretary of the State of Connecticut	
John E. Davis	North Dakota 1935	Governor of North Dakota, director of the Defense Civil Preparedness Agency, and North Dakota Senate	
Mark L. De Motte	DePauw 1853	US House of Representatives from Indiana	
David Dewhurst	Arizona 1967	Lieutenant Governor of Texas	
Robert Docking	Kansas 1946	Governor of Kansas and mayor of Kansas City, Missouri	
Ozro J. Dodds	Miami 1861	US House of Representatives from Ohio	
Bob Dold	Denison 1991	US House of Representatives from Illinois	
John E. Dolibois	Miami 1942	US Ambassador to Luxembourg	
Chuck Douglas	Wesleyan 1964	US House of Representatives from New Hampshire and New Hampshire Supreme Court Associate Justice	
Adolph Dubs	Beloit 1942	US Ambassador to Afghanistan	
Tony Earl	Michigan State 1958	Governor of Wisconsin	
Harvey J. Eckley	Washington & Jefferson 1868	Member of Ohio Senate and judge	
Alonzo J. Edgerton	Wesleyan 1850	US Senator from Minnesota, Minnesota Senate, Minnesota House of Representatives, and United States District Court for the District of South Dakota	
Paul C. Edmunds	Virginia 1856	US House of Representatives from Virginia	
Samuel Hitt Elbert	Ohio Wesleyan 1854	Governor of the Colorado Territory, Secretary of the Territory of Colorado, and chief justice of the Colorado Supreme Court	
William Elliott	Virginia 1858	US House of Representatives from South Carolina	
Ezekiel John Ellis	Centenary 1859	US House of Representatives from Louisiana	
Robert Ellsworth	Kansas 1946	US House of Representatives from Kansas, US Permanent Representative to NATO, Deputy Secretary of Defense	
Oscar R. Ewing	Indiana 1910	3rd Administrator of the Federal Security Agency, vice-chair of Democratic National Committee, lawyer, social reformer, and one of the main authors of the Fair Deal program	
Z. W. Ewing	Virginia 1868	Tennessee senator and lieutenant governor of Tennessee	
Joseph S. Farland	West Virginia 1938	US Ambassador to the Dominican Republic, US Ambassador to Panama, US Ambassador to Iran, and US Ambassador to Pakistan	
Joseph R. Farrington	Wisconsin 1919	US House of Representatives from Hawaii Territory district and Hawaii Territorial Senate	
Wallace Rider Farrington	Maine 1891	Governor of the Territory of Hawaii	
Charles James Faulkner	VMI 1868	US Senator from West Virginia	
Mark Felt	Idaho 1935	Associate Director of the FBI; exposed the Nixon administration's corruption as "Deep Throat"	
Scott Field	Virginia 1868	US House of Representatives from Texas	
George Benson Fox	Ohio Wesleyan 1861	Ohio Senate and Ohio General Assembly	
David R. Francis	Washington University in St. Louis 1870	Governor of Missouri, US Secretary of the Interior, US Ambassador to Russia, and president of Louisiana Purchase Exposition	
Bob Franks	DePauw 1973	US House of Representatives from New Jersey	
William E. Fuller	Iowa 1870	US House of Representatives from Iowa	
Samuel Galloway	Miami 1855	US House of Representatives from Ohio	
Alexander H. Garnjost	Cornell 1917	New York State Assembly	
Dick Gephardt	Northwestern 1962	US House of Representatives from Missouri; US House Minority Leader	
Jack Geraghty	Washington 1956	Mayor of Spokane, Washington	
John Milton Glover	Washington University in St. Louis 1871	US House of Representatives from Missouri	
Abe Goff	Idaho 1922	US House of Representatives from Idaho and Idaho Senate	
Stephen Goldsmith	Wabash 1968	Mayor of Indianapolis, Indiana	
John B. Gordon	Georgia 1854	US Senator from Georgia, Governor of Georgia, and major general in the Confederate States Army	
Howard Mason Gore	West Virginia 1900	Governor of West Virginia and United States Secretary of Agriculture, and West Virginia Commissioner of Agriculture	
Miles T. Granger	Wesleyan 1842	US House of Representatives from Connecticut	
Levi T. Griffin	Michigan 1857	US House of Representatives from Michigan	
George Blackmore Guild	Cumberland 1855	Mayor of Nashville, Tennessee	
Steve Gunderson	Wisconsin 1973	US House Representative from Wisconsin	
Fred L. Hadsel	Miami 1937	US Ambassador to Somalia and US Ambassador to Ghana	
William T. Haines	Maine 1876	Governor of Maine	
H. R. Haldeman	UCLA 1948	White House Chief of Staff; convicted Watergate scandal conspirator	
Benton Jay Hall	Miami 1855	US House of Representatives from Iowa	
Charles A. Halleck	Indiana 1922	US House of Representatives from Indiana	
John Hanna	DePauw 1858	US House of Representatives from Indiana	
Mike Harcourt	British Columbia 1963	Premier of British Columbia and mayor of Vancouver	
Charles Henry Hardin	Miami 1841	Governor of Missouri	
James Harlan	DePauw 1845	US Senator from Iowa; United States Secretary of the Interior	
Henry R. Harris	Emory 1847	US House of Representatives from Georgia	
Louis P. Harvey	Western Reserve 1840	Governor of Wisconsin	
Mark Hatfield	Willamette 1943	US Senator and Governor of Oregon	
Joe Heck	Penn State 1984	US House of Representatives from Nevada	
Pat Henry	Mississippi 1882	US House of Representatives from Mississippi	
Robert R. Hitt	DePauw 1855	US House of Representatives from Illinois	
George Hoadly	Western Reserve 1844	Governor of California and US House of Representatives from California	
Henry William Hoffman	Washington and Jefferson 1846	US House of Representatives from Maryland	
Glen Holden Sr.	Oregon 1951	US Ambassador to Jamaica	
Edward E. Holland	Richmond 1879	US House of Representatives from Virginia	
Linwood Holton	W&L 1945	Governor of Virginia	
Stanley Hornbeck	Colorado 1903	US Ambassador to the Netherlands	
Jonas G. Howard	DePauw 1847	US House of Representatives from Indiana	
Frank N. Ikard	Texas 1932	US House Representative from Texas	
Clifford C. Ireland	Knox 1901	US House of Representatives from Illinois	
James F. Izlar	Emory 1855	US House of Representatives from South Carolina	
Craig James	Florida 1963	US House of Representatives from Florida	
William Marion Jardine	Kansas State 1894	US Secretary of Agriculture, US Ambassador to Egypt, president of Kansas State Agricultural College, and Kansas State Treasurer	
Eric M. Javits	Columbia 1952	Ambassador to the Organisation for the Prohibition of Chemical Weapons	
Leslie Jensen	South Dakota	Governor of South Dakota	
Martin N. Johnson	Iowa 1873	US Senator from North Dakota	
Brereton C. Jones	Virginia 1961	Governor of Kentucky, Lieutenant Governor of Kentucky, and West Virginia House of Delegates	
Doug Jones	Alabama 1976	US Senator from Alabama	
David Karnes	Nebraska 1971	US Senator from Nebraska	
James P. Kem	Missouri 1910	US Senator from Missouri	
William E. Kemp	Missouri 1914	Mayor of Kansas City, Missouri	
Peter Kinder	Missouri 1976	Lieutenant Governor of Missouri	
William M. Kinsey	Monmouth 1869	US Representative from Missouri	
William F. Kopp	Iowa Wesleyan 1892	US Representative from Iowa	
Edward H. Kruse	Indiana 1940	US Representative from Indiana	
Bruce Kyle	Emory 1991	Florida House of Representatives	
Robert M. La Follette Jr.	Wisconsin 1917	US Senator from Wisconsin and Governor of Wisconsin	
Charles B. Landis	Wabash 1883	US Representative from Indiana	
Milton Latham	Jefferson 1843	US Senator from California and Governor of California	
John J. Lentz	Wooster 1881	US Representative from Ohio	
Fred D. Letts	Iowa 1899	US Representative from Iowa	
David Linton	Miami 1839	Ohio State Senator; co-founder of Beta Theta Pi	
Tom Loeffler	Texas 1971	US House Representative from Texas	
Frank O. Lowden	Iowa 1885	US House Representative from Illinois and Governor of Illinois	
Richard Lugar	Denison 1954	US Senator from Indiana and Mayor of Indianapolis, Indiana	
Ray Mabus	Mississippi 1969	Governor of Mississippi, US Ambassador to Saudi Arabia, and Secretary of the Navy	
Humphrey Marshall	Transylvania 1845	US House of Representatives from Kentucky and US Minister to China	
Roger Marshall	Kansas State 1984	US Senator from Kansas	
James G. Martin	Davidson 1957	US House of Representatives and Governor of North Carolina	
Henry M. Mathews	West Virginia 1857	Governor of West Virginia	
Courtland C. Matson	DePauw 1862	US House of Representatives from Indiana	
Stanley Matthews	Cincinnati 1842	US Senator from Ohio; US Supreme Court Justice	
John J. McCloy	Amherst 1916	United States Assistant Secretary of War and presidential advisor	
James L. McConaughy	Yale 1909	Governor of Connecticut and Lieutenant Governor of Connecticut	
John W. McCormick	Ohio 1855	US House of Representatives from Ohio	
James W. McDill	Miami 1853	US House of Representatives from Iowa	
Joseph E. McDonald	DePauw 1849	US Senator from Indiana	
David McKinley	Purdue 1969	US House of Representatives from West Virginia, member of West Virginia House of Delegates	
William P. McLean	North Carolina 1857	US House of Representatives from Texas	
William H. McMaster	Beloit 1899	US Senator from South Dakota and Governor of South Dakota	
Paul V. McNutt	Indiana 1913	Governor of Indiana and first US Ambassador to the Philippines	
Robert W. Miers	Indiana 1870	US House of Representatives from Indiana	
Andrew Jackson Montague	Richmond 1882	US House of Representatives from Virginia and Governor of Virginia	
J. Waldo Monteith	Toronto 1927	Member of the House of Commons of Canada	
Arch A. Moore Jr.	West Virginia 1951	Governor of West Virginia and US House of Representatives from West Virginia	
Dwight Morrow	Amherst 1895	Senator from New Jersey and US Ambassador to Mexico	
Oliver P. Morton	Miami 1847	Governor of Indiana	
David C. Mulford	Lawrence 1959	US Ambassador to India	
John Mutz	Northwestern 1957	Lieutenant Governor of Indiana and President of Lilly Endowment	
Albinus Nance	Knox 1868	Governor of Nebraska	
Bill Nelson	Yale 1964	US House of Representatives from Florida, US Senator from Florida, State Treasurer of Florida;	
John Stoughton Newberry	Michigan 1847	US House of Representatives from Michigan	
Dick Nichols	Kansas State 1951	US House of Representatives from Kansas	
Don Nickles	Oklahoma State 1971	US Senator from Oklahoma	
John W. Noble	Miami 1850	US Secretary of the Interior	
Jeremiah E. O'Connell	Boston 1906	US House of Representatives from Rhode Island and justice of Rhode Island Supreme Court	
Benjamin Odell	Bethany 1877	US House of Representatives from New York	
Richard B. Ogilvie	Yale 1945	Governor of Illinois	
Alvin M. Owsley	Texas 1912	US Ambassador to Romania	
Bob Packwood	Willamette 1954	US Senator from Oregon	
Halbert E. Paine	Western Reserve 1845	US House of Representatives from Wisconsin	
Guy Brasfield Park	Missouri 1896	Governor of Missouri	
Richard Cunningham Patterson Jr.	Nebraska 1909	US Ambassador to Yugoslavia, US Ambassador to Guatemala, and US Minister to Switzerland, vice-president and director of the National Broadcasting Co., and chairman of RKO Corp.	
John M. Pattison	Ohio Wesleyan 1869	US House of Representatives from Ohio and Governor of Ohio	
George Smith Patton	VMI 1877	Mayor of San Marino, California and father of General George S. Patton	
James Paull	Washington & Jefferson 1923	West Virginia Senate	
Boies Penrose	Harvard 1881	US Senator from Pennsylvania	
William J. Perry	Carnegie Mellon 1949	US Secretary of Defense	
David Peterson	Western Ontario 1966	Premier of Ontario	
Walter R. Peterson Jr.	Dartmouth 1947	Governor of New Hampshire	
Bill Phelps	Missouri 1956	US House of Representatives from Missouri	
Robert H. Phinny	North Carolina 1945	US Ambassador to Swaziland	
Michael Pitfield	St. Lawrence 1956	Canadian Senator	
Henry Moses Pollard	Dartmouth 1857	US House of Representatives from Missouri	
John G. Pollard	Richmond 1891	Governor of Virginia	
Laurence Pope	Bowdoin 1967	US Ambassador to Chad	
Andrew Jackson Poppleton	Michigan 1851	Mayor of Omaha, Nebraska	
Albert G. Porter	DePauw 1843	Governor of Indiana; US House of Representatives from Indiana; and US Minister to Italy	
George M. Pritchard	North Carolina 1907	US House of Representatives from North Carolina	
Jacob J. Pugsley	Miami 1859	US House of Representatives from Ohio	
Matthew Quay	Jefferson 1850	US Senator from Pennsylvania	
Saul Rae	Texas 1936	Canadian Ambassador to the United Nations, Canadian Ambassador to Mexico, Canadian Ambassador to Guatemala and the Netherlands	
Joseph L. Rawlins	Indiana 1874	US Senator from Utah	
John H. Ray	Minnesota 1908	US House of Representatives from New York	
Henry Augustus Reeves	Michigan 1852	US House of Representatives from Michigan	
Robert R. Reynolds	North Carolina 1906	US Senator from North Carolina	
John Jacob Rhodes	Kansas State 1938	US House of Representatives from Arizona; US House Minority Leader	
Robert G. Rich Jr.	Florida 1952	US Ambassador to Belize	
Ira E. Rider	St. Lawrence 1888	US House of Representatives from New York	
Richard O. Ristine	Wabash 1941	Lieutenant Governor of Indiana and Indiana Senate	
William Alfred Robinson	Toronto 1925	Member of the Canadian House of Commons	
Charlie Rose	Davidson 1961	US House of Representatives from North Carolina	
Arthur B. Rouse	Hanover 1896	US House of Representatives from Kentucky	
Thomas L. Rubey	Missouri 1885	US House of Representatives from Missouri	
Eugene P. Ruehlmann	Cincinnati 1947	Mayor of Cincinnati, Ohio	
Aimaro Satō	DePauw 1881	Japanese Ambassador to the United States	
Jake Sawatzky	British Columbia 2024	Member of the Canadian House of Commons	
Daniel Schaefer	South Dakota 1958	US House of Representatives from Colorado	
Charles Frederick Scott	Kansas 1881	US House of Representatives from Kansas and Kansas State Senator	
Harvey D. Scott	DePauw 1850	US House of Representatives from Indiana	
Townsend Scudder	Columbia 1888	US House of Representatives from New York	
Fred A. Seaton	Kansas State 1931	US Secretary of the Interior, US Senator from Nebraska, and Assistant Secretary of Defense	
Philip Sharp	DePauw 1964	US House of Representatives from Indiana	
David Sholtz	Yale 1914	Governor of Florida	
Scott Sifton	Truman State 1996	Member of the Missouri Senate	
George G. Siebels Jr.	Virginia 1937	Mayor of Birmingham, Alabama	
Arnold Smith	Toronto 1935	Canadian Ambassador to Egypt the USSR	
Denny Smith	Willamette 1960	US House of Representatives from Oregon	
Frank Ellis Smith	Mississippi 1941	US House of Representatives from Mississippi	
John M. C. Smith	Michigan 1881	US House of Representatives from Michigan	
Bertrand Snell	Amherst 1894	US House of Representatives from New York	
Earl Snell	Oregon 1907	Governor of Oregon	
Charles Wilbert Snow	Bowdoin 1907	Governor of Connecticut	
Zack Space	Kenyon 1983	US House of Representatives from Ohio	
William B. Spencer	Centenary 1855	US House of Representatives from Louisiana	
John Spratt	Davidson 1964	US House of Representatives from South Carolina	
William McKendree Springer	Indiana 1857	US House of Representatives from Illinois	
William Francis Stevenson	Davidson 1885	US House of Representatives from South Carolina	
Kevin Stitt	Oklahoma State 1995	Governor of Oklahoma	
Edward C. Stokes	Brown 1883	Governor of New Jersey	
Reginald H. Sullivan	Wabash 1897	Mayor of Indianapolis, Indiana	
Howard Sutherland	Westminster 1889	US Senator from West Virginia	
Robert Franklin Sutherland	Toronto 1911	Member of the Canadian House of Commons	
Mike Synar	Oklahoma 1972	US House Representative from Oklahoma	
Charles Phelps Taft II	Yale 1918	Governor of Ohio and Mayor of Cincinnati, Ohio	
Leon Rutherford Taylor	Denison 1907	Governor of New Jersey	
Charles M. Teague	Stanford 1931	US House of Representatives for California	
Hosea Townsend	Western Reserve 1864	US House of Representatives from Colorado	
Henry St. George Tucker III	W&L 1875	US House of Representatives from Virginia	
John Turner	British Columbia 1952	Prime Minister of Canada	
Al Ullman	Whitman 1935	US House of Representatives from Oregon	
William H. Upson	Western Reserve 1842	US House of Representatives from Ohio	
Daniel W. Voorhees	DePauw 1849	US Senator from Indiana	
Durbin Ward	Miami 1843	Member of the Kentucky General Assembly and brevet brigadier general during the Civil War	
George B. Ward	Cumberland 1887	Mayor of Birmingham, Alabama	
John H. Ware III	Pennsylvania 1930	US House of Representatives from Pennsylvania and Pennsylvania State Senate	
John Warner	W&L 1950	Secretary of the Navy; US Senator from Virginia; namesake of the attack submarine USS John Warner (SSN-785)	
Albert Henry Washburn	Cornell 1889	American Envoy Extraordinary and US Minister to Austria	
Walter A. Watson	Hampden-Sydney 1887	US House of Representatives from Virginia and Virginia Senate	
Claude Weaver	Texas 1887	US House of Representatives from Oklahoma	
Ed Weber	Denison 1953	US House of Representatives from Ohio	
Tom Wheeler	Ohio State 1968	Chairman of the Federal Communications Commission	
Kenneth S. Wherry	Nebraska 1914	US Senator and Senate Minority Leader, Nebraska Senate	
William F. Whiting	Amherst 1886	US Secretary of Commerce	
Jamie Whitten	Mississippi 1933	US House of Representatives from Mississippi	
Ben M. Williamson	Bethany 1886	US Senator from Kentucky	
Wendell Willkie	Indiana 1916	1940 Republican Party nominee for President of the United States and member of Indiana House of Representatives	
Charles Erwin Wilson	Carnegie 1909	US Secretary of Defense	
Joseph G. Wilson	Miami 1846	US House of Representatives from Oregon	
Charles E. Winter	Iowa Wesleyan 1892	US House of Representatives from Wyoming; acting Governor of Puerto Rico	
Bill Wirtz	Beloit 1933	US Secretary of Labor	
John Sergeant Wise	Virginia 1867	US House of Representatives from Virginia and United States Attorney for the Eastern District of Virginia	
Josiah O. Wolcott	Wesleyan 1901	US Senator from Delaware, chief justice of the Delaware Supreme Court, and Attorney General of Delaware	
Wendell Wyatt	Oregon 1939	US House of Representatives from Oregon	
J. Smith Young	Centenary 1855	US House of Representatives from Louisiana	
Philip Young	St. Lawrence 1931	US Ambassador to the Netherlands	
Eugene M. Zuckert	Yale 1933	United States Secretary of the Air Force	

== Religion ==
Name	Chapter and year	Notability	Ref.
Charles E. Bennison	Lawrence 1965	Bishop, Episcopal Diocese of Pennsylvania	
Earl Cranston	Ohio 1861	Bishop, Methodist Episcopal Church	
Christopher Epting	Florida 1969	Bishop of the Episcopal Diocese of Iowa	
Milton M. McGorrill	Bowdoin 1919	Baptist minister, religious author, and church pastor in Boulder, Chicago and other U.S. cities. Best known for sparking a major Baptist theological controversy in 1923	
Gregory Parkes	Florida State University 1986	Bishop, Roman Catholic Diocese of Saint Petersburg	

== Sports ==
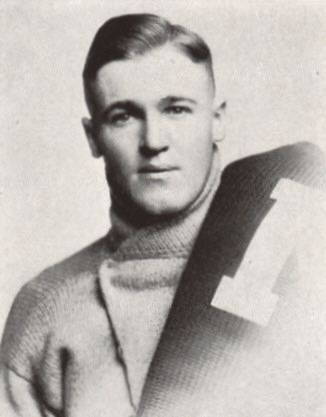
Guy Chamberlin

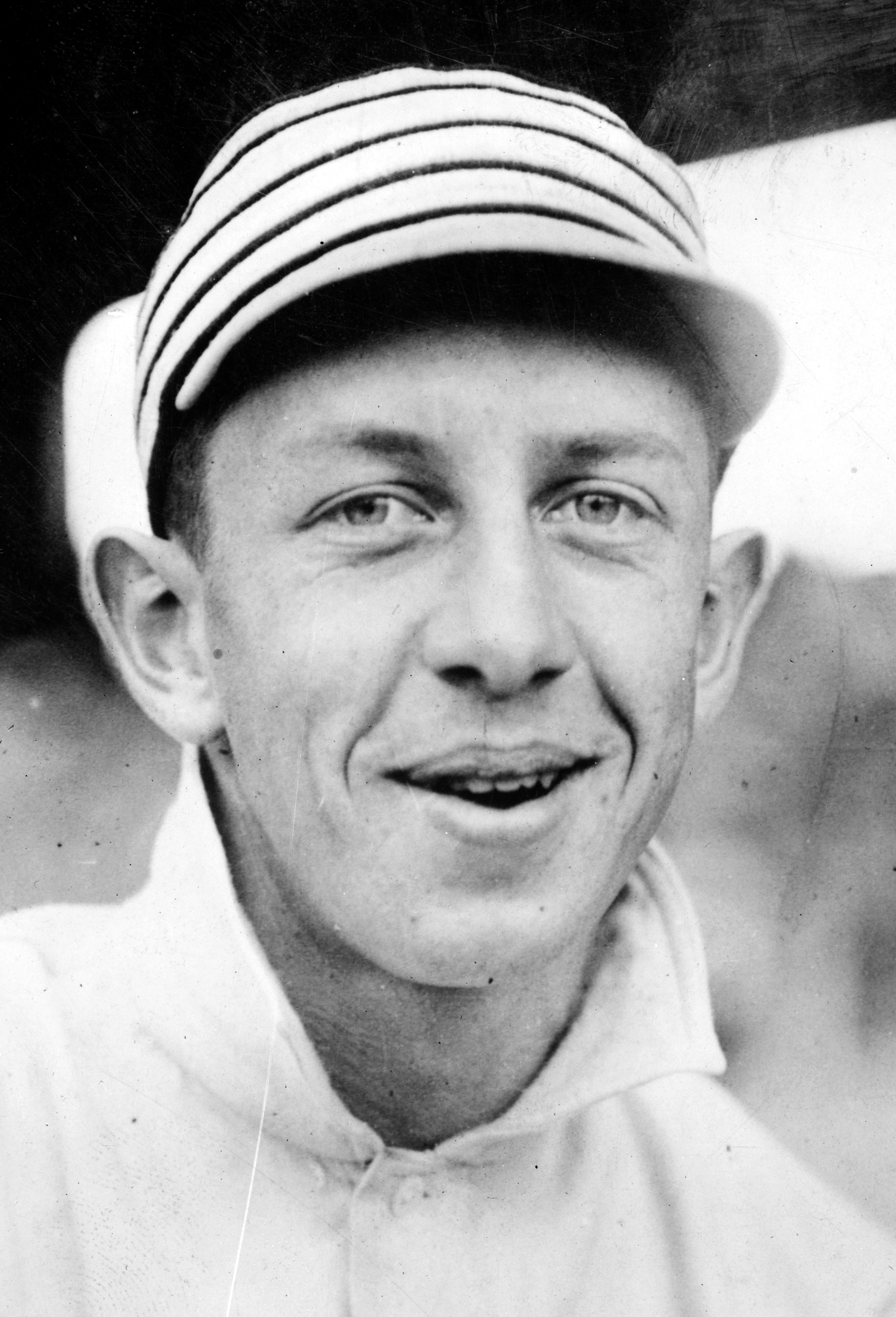
Eddie Collins

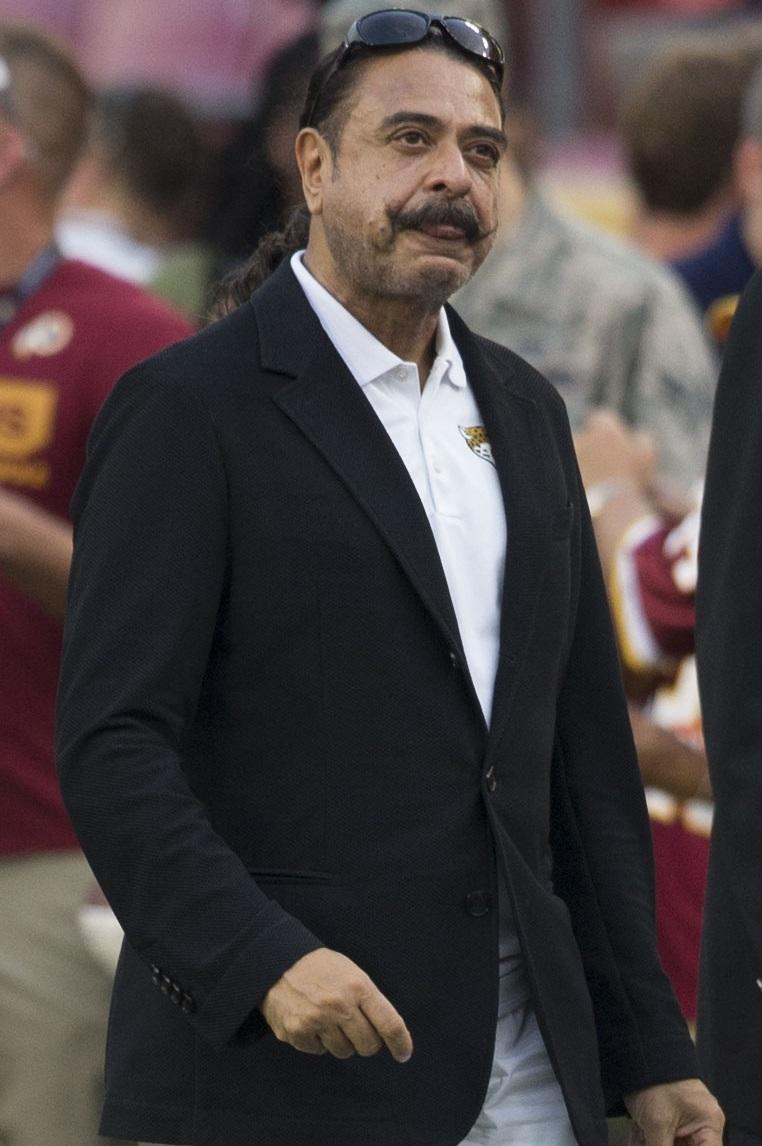
Shahid Khan

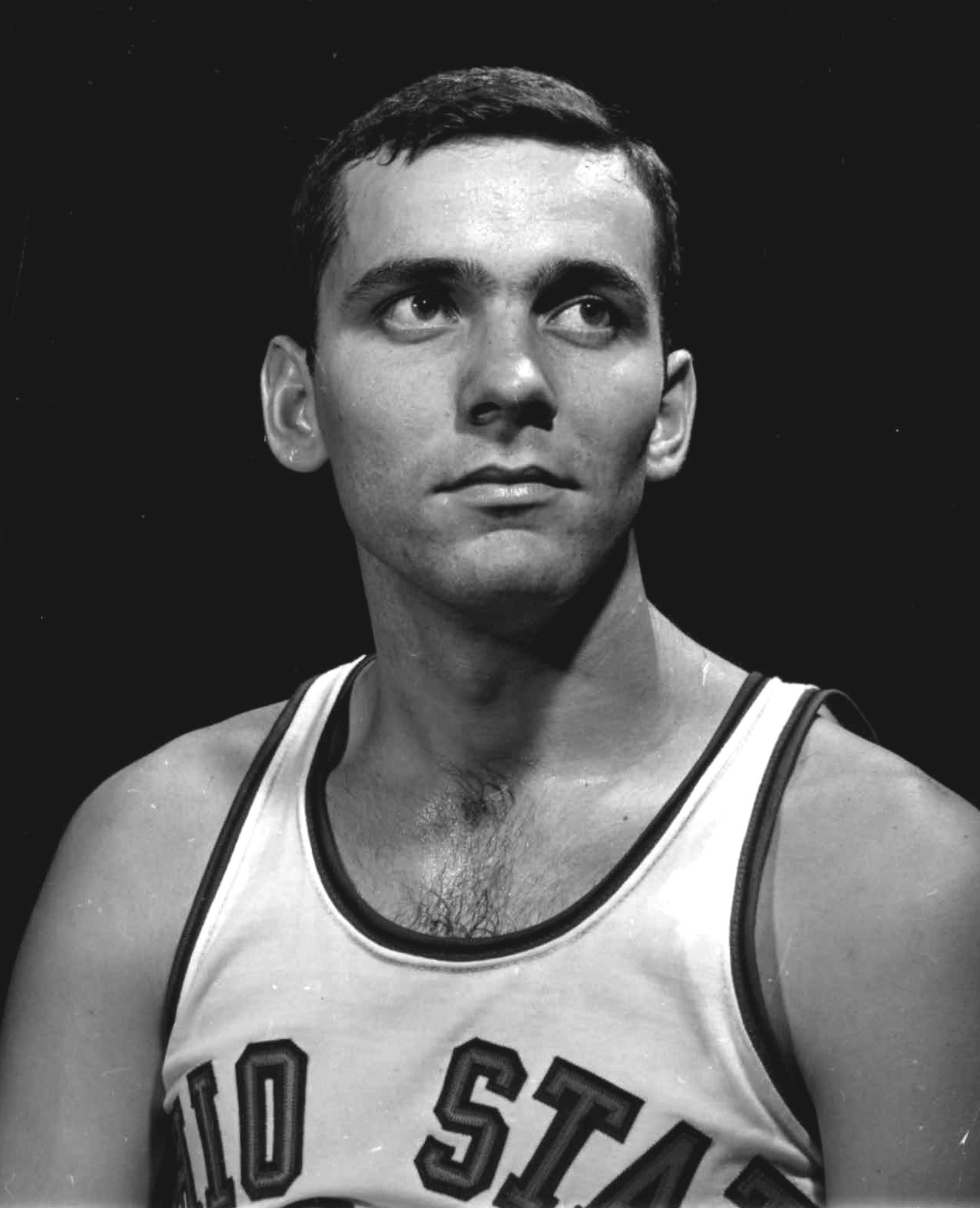
Jerry Lucas

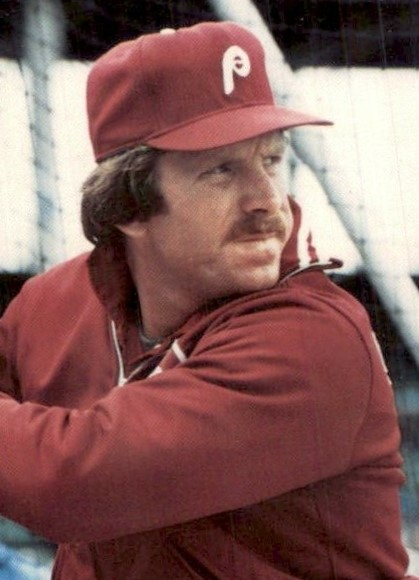
Mike Schmidt

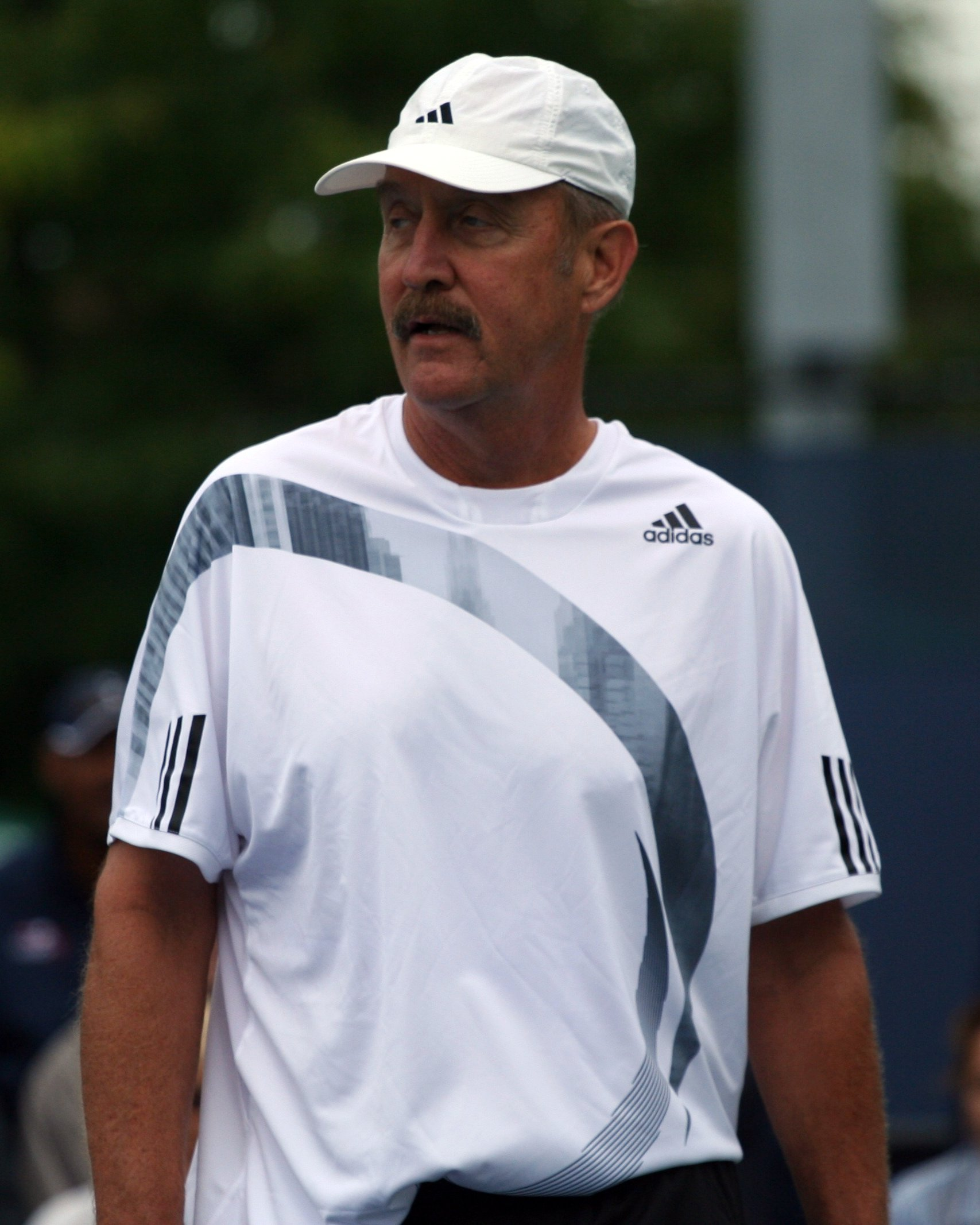
Stan Smith

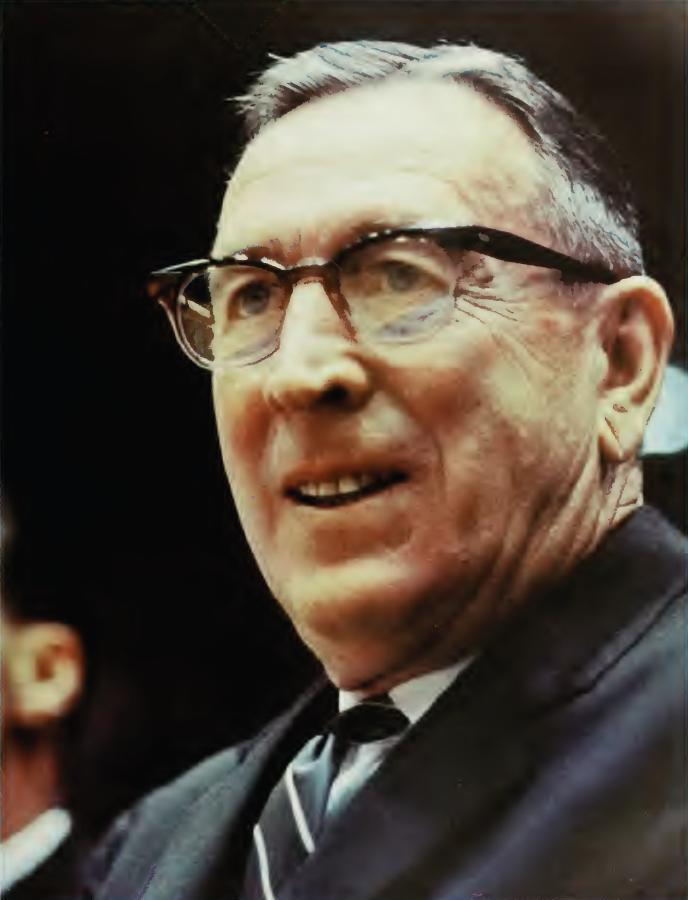
John Wooden

Name	Chapter and year	Notability	Ref.
Fred Ahern	Bowdoin 1974	NHL player with the California Seals, Cleveland Barons, and Colorado Rockies	
Ethan Allen	Cincinnati 1926	Major League Baseball player; head baseball coach at Yale University	
Frank Baumholtz	Ohio 1941	Professional basketball player and Major League Baseball player	
Matty Bell	Centre 1920	College football player, college football coach, and athletic administrator	
Jim Benepe	Northwestern 1986	Professional golfer	
Earl Blaik	Miami 1918	Head football coach at Dartmouth College and the United States Military Academy	
Carl Blaurock	Colorado Mines 1916	Mountaineer, first American to climb all mountains over 14,000 feet in the continental US	
Joe Bottom	Southern California 1977	1976 Summer Olympics silver medalist in 100m butterfly strokey	
Don Bragg	UCLA 1959	1960 Summer Olympics gold medalist in pole vault	
Evan Brown	SMU 2017	Center for the New York Giants, Cleveland Browns, and Detroit Lions	
Mike Brown	Dartmouth 1957	President and general manager of the Cincinnati Bengals	
Dave Brundage	Oregon State 1986	Minor League Baseball player and coach	
Jim Brunzell	Minnesota 1971	Professional wrestler and co-author of the Killer Bees comic book series	
George Buehler	Stanford 1969	Professional football player with the Los Angeles Raiders	
John Bunn	Kansas 1920	Key contributor to the game of basketball	
Guy Chamberlin	Nebraska 1916	College and pro football Hall of Famer: 5x NFL champion (1921, 1922, 1923, 1924, 1926)	
Pete Cipollone	California 1994	2004 Summer Olympics gold medalist, rowing	
Bob Clotworthy	Ohio State 1954	1952 Summer Olympics silver medalist and 1956 Summer Olympics gold medalist in springboard diving	
Roy Cochran	Indiana 1941	1948 Summer Olympics gold medalist, 400m hurdles, 4 × 400 m relay	
John P. Dikeou	Colorado 1957	Baseball executive instrumental in bringing MLB to Colorado via the Colorado Rockies	
Ron Coder	Penn State 1976	Professional football player with Seattle Seahawks	
Don Cohan	Amherst 1951	1972 Summer Olympics bronze medalist, sailing	
Eddie Collins	Columbia 1907	Major League Baseball Hall of Famer with the Philadelphia Athletics and the Chicago White Sox, won Six (6) World Series. World Series MVP in 1924.	
Don Coryell	Washington 1947	Coach of the San Diego Chargers	
Bill Alsup	Colorado 1960	American IndyCar / CART race car driver	
Mel Counts	Oregon State 1964	Professional basketball player who won two NBA titles with the Boston Celtics; Olympic gold medalist in basketball, 1964	
Edgar Diddle	Centre 1919	Basketball coach at Western Kentucky University; first coach to win 1,000 games at one school	
DeLoss Dodds	Kansas State 1959	University of Texas at Austin athletic director	
Charles Doe	Stanford 1920	1920 Summer Olympics and 1924 Summer Olympics gold medalist, rugby	
Bobby Douglass	Kansas 1969	Professional football player with the Chicago Bears	
Shane Douglas	Bethany 1986	Professional wrestler and ECW World Heavyweight Champion	
Eddie Eagan	Denver 1920	1920 Summer Olympics gold medalist, boxing 178-lb and 1932 Winter Olympics gold medalist in bobsledding	
Keith Fahnhorst	Minnesota 1974	Professional football player with San Francisco 49ers, Super Bowl XVI & XIX Champion	
Max Falkenstien	Kansas 1947	Kansas Jayhawks radio announcer	
Otto Werlin	Colorado 1947	Colorado skiing pioneer and longtime Loveland Ski Area manager	
John Ferris	Stanford 1971	1968 Summer Olympics bronze medalist in the 200M and 200 butterfly stroke	
Jay Fiedler	Dartmouth 1994	Professional football player with the Miami Dolphins	
Dow Finsterwald	Ohio 1952	Professional golfer	
Jeff Float	Southern California 1983	1984 Summer Olympics bronze medalist, 4x200 freestyle relay	
Travis Ford	Missouri 1991	Head basketball coach for Oklahoma State University	
Ken Forsch	Oregon State 1969	Major League Baseball; two-time All-Star team selection; pitched a no-hitter on 7 April 1979	
Bruce Furniss	Southern California 1979	1976 Summer Olympics gold medalist, 4x200 freestyle relay and 200 freestyle swimming	
Steve Furniss	Southern California 1975	1972 Summer Olympics bronze medalist, 200 IM swimming	
Dave Gagnon	Colgate 1991	Professional hockey player with the Detroit Red Wings	
George Glamack	North Carolina early 1940s	All American basketball with the NBL, Rookie of the Year 1942	
Iñaki Gómez	British Columbia 2010	2012 Summer Olympics Canadian team member, race walking	
Gail Goodrich	UCLA 1965	Professional basketball player with the Los Angeles Lakers	
Dan Greenbaum	Southern California 1992	1992 Summer Olympics bronze medalist, volleyball	
Dan Guerrero	UCLA 1974	UCLA Bruins athletic director	
Ed Hamm	Georgia Tech 1928	1928 Summer Olympics gold medalist, long jump	
George Harrison	Stanford 1961	1960 Summer Olympics gold medalist, 4x200 freestyle relay	
Eric McCarty	Colorado 1993	Head team physician for the NHL's Colorado Avalanche, and president of the American Orthopaedic Society for Sports Medicine (AOSSM) (2025- )	
Dick Harter	North Carolina 1952	NBA coach; first head coach for the Charlotte Hornets	
John H. Mason	Oklahoma A&M (Oklahoma State) 1925	American college football player and coach	
Homer Hazel	Rutgers 1925	Football player and coach	
Alan Helffrich	Penn State 1925	1924 Summer Olympics gold medalist, 4 × 400 m relay	
Bob Higgins	Penn State 1918	Professional football player and college football coach	
Mark Jerue	Washington 1982	Professional football player with the New York Jets	
Brian Job	Stanford	1968 Summer Olympics bronze medalist, 200m breaststroke	
Brandt Jobe	UCLA 1989	Professional golfer	
Grier Jones	Oklahoma State 1968	Professional golfer	
Charlie Justice	North Carolina 1950	Professional football player with the Washington Redskins; three-time All-American	
Robert Kane	Cornell 1934	President of the US Olympic Committee	
Jeff Kemp	Dartmouth 1981	Professional football player with the Los Angeles Rams for 5 seasons.	
Shahid Khan	Illinois 1971	Owner of the Jacksonville Jaguars	
Johnny Kitzmiller	Oregon 1930	College and professional football player with the New York Giants	
William Koch	MIT 1962	1992 America's Cup winner	
George Kojac	Rutgers 1931	1928 Summer Olympics gold medalist, 100 backstroke, 4x200 relay	
Ryan Kuehl	Virginia 1995	Professional football player	
Cawood Ledford	Centre College	University of Kentucky basketball commentator	
David Lipsky	Northwestern University	Professional golfer	
Jerry Lucas	Ohio State 1962	Professional basketball player player, college basketball coach, 1960 Summer Olympics gold medalist, basketball	
Larry MacPhail	Beloit 1910	Club president and general manager with the Cincinnati Reds, Brooklyn Dodgers, and New York Yankees	
Jim Mandich	Michigan 1970	Professional football player with Miami Dolphins	
Steve Marino	UVA 2002	Professional golfer	
Kent Massey	Oklahoma 1974	1996 Summer Olympics bronze medalist, sailing	
Scott McCarron	UCLA 1989	Professional golfer	
Charles McGinnis	Wisconsin 1927	1928 Summer Olympics bronze medalist, pole vault	
Bo McMillan	Centre 1922	Football player and coach	
John Lester Miller	Yale 1924	1924 Summer Olympics gold medalist, rowing	
Matt Monger	Oklahoma State 1984	Professional football player with the Buffalo Bills in the Super Bowl XXV	
Ray Morrison	Vanderbilt 1912	Head football coach at Southern Methodist University, Vanderbilt University, Temple University, and Austin College	
Dave Mauer	Denison 1954	Football player, college football coach, and athletic administrator	
Lowell North	UC Berkeley 1971	1964 Summer Olympics bronze medalist, yachting; 1968 Summer Olympics gold medalist, yachting	
Pat O'Dea	Wisconsin 1900	Australian rules and American football player and coach	
John Orsi	Colgate 1932	Football player and coach	
Gus Otto	Missouri 1965	Professional football player with the Oakland Raiders	
John Parker	Stanford 1970	1972 Summer Olympics bronze medalist, water polo	
Bob Pearce	Oklahoma 1931	1932 Summer Olympics gold medalist, wrestling 128-lb	
Pete Pihos	Indiana 1945	Professional football player with the Philadelphia Eagles	
Pat Powers	Southern California 1980	1984 Summer Olympics gold medalist, volleyball	
Chip Reese	Dartmouth 1973	Professional poker player	
Ed Rimkus	St. Lawrence 1937	1948 Winter Olympics gold medalist, bobsledding	
Jamey Rootes	Clemson 1988	Major League Soccer general manager, Columbus Crew and Houston Texans	
Murray Rose	Southern California 1961	1956 Summer Olympics gold medalist in 400 freestyle swimming, 4x200 relay, and 1500 freestyle; 1960 Summer Olympics silver medalist for 1500 freestyle, and bronze medalist for 4x200 relay	
Ed Roski Jr.	Southern California 1962	Owner Los Angeles Kings hockey team	
Dick Roth	Stanford 1969	1964 Summer Olympics gold medalist, 400 IM swimming	
Harlow Rothert	Stanford 1930	1932 Summer Olympics silver medalist, shot put	
Mike Schmidt	Ohio 1971	Major League Baseball player; hit 548 home runs; member of the Baseball Hall of Fame	
John Shadden	Southern California 1987	1988 Summer Olympics bronze medalist, yachting	
Gary Sheerer	Stanford 1968	1972 Summer Olympics bronze medalist, water polo	
Dave Shula	Texas 1973	Head coach of the Cincinnati Bengals	
Jerry Sichting	Purdue 1979	NBA coach	
Stan Smith	Southern California 1969	Professional tennis player; winner of the 1977 US Open – Men's singles and the 1972 Wimbledon Championships – Men's singles	
Bill Sprackling	Brown 1912	College Football Hall of Fame	
Bob Stein	Minnesota 1969	Professional football player with the Kansas City Chiefs	
Mal Stevens	Yale 1924	Football player and coach	
Kevin Still	UCLA 1982	1984 Summer Olympics bronze medalist, rowing coxed-pairs	
Bill Stoneman	Idaho 1966	General manager of the Los Angeles Angels; Major League Baseball player	
John Tavener	Indiana 1944	College football player	
William G. Thompson	UC Berkeley 1929	1928 Summer Olympics gold medalist, rowing eight oars	
Bill Veeck	Kenyon 1936	Major League Baseball franchise owner; Hall of Fame member	
Rick Volk	Michigan 1967	Professional football player with the Miami Dolphins	
Ben Wilson	Heidelberg 1944	Head football coach at Wichita State University	
John Wooden	Purdue 1932	Head basketball coach at UCLA	
