= Thomas Swain Barclay =

American academic (1892–1993)

Thomas Swain Barclay (January 26, 1892 – December 21, 1993) was a professor of political science at Stanford University. He taught five U.S. senators and countless other Stanford University students over three decades.

Barclay was born into a politically active Democratic family in St. Louis, Missouri.

Barclay received A.B. and A.M. degrees in political science from the University of Missouri, a doctorate at Columbia University, and an honorary doctorate of law from the University of Missouri for his accomplishments as a teacher, scholar and student of politics and government. He died at the age of 101 in 1993.
