= List of University of Missouri alumni =

This is a list of notable alumni of the University of Missouri in Columbia, Missouri.

== Academia ==
- Thomas Swain Barclay (BA 2015, ΒΘΠ), professor of political science at Stanford University
- George E. Bates (B.A., M.A.), professor of Investment Management at the Harvard Business School; editor of the Harvard Business Review
- Thomas Curtright (B.S. 1970, M.S. 1970), professor of Physics at University of Miami
- Walter Dandy (B.S. 1907), professor of Medicine at Johns Hopkins University School of Medicine; considered a founding father of modern neurosurgery.
- Clifton C. Edom (BJ 1946), Mizzou photojournalism professor and co-founder of Pictures of the Year, Missouri Photo Workshop, and Kappa Alpha Mu
- Robert P. Foster (M.A., Ph.D.), president of Northwest Missouri State University (1964–1977)
- Robert J. Jones (PhD 1978), chancellor at the University of Illinois at Urbana-Champaign and former president at the University of Albany
- Matthew Kroenig (BA), associate professor of Government and Foreign Service at Georgetown University
- Uel W. Lamkin (attended), president of Northwest Missouri State University (1921–1945)
- Anderson Delano Macklin (1933–2001), visual artist, professor, art historian
- John C. McManus (PhD), military historian, author, and professor of military history at the Missouri University of Science and Technology
- Susan Morey (BS 1990), professor and chair of the Mathematics department at Texas State University
- Francis Joseph Mullin, president of Shimer College
- Velma McBride Murry, psychologist and sociologist at Vanderbilt University
- Donald E. Pease (BA 1968, MA 1969), professor of English and Comparative Literature at Dartmouth College
- Mark Pope (AB 1973, MEd 1974), Thomas Jefferson professor and Curators' Distinguished professor Emeritus of counseling at University of Missouri-St. Louis, president of the American Counseling Association (2003–2004)
- Henry P. Rusk (BS 1908, MA 1911), dean of the College of Agriculture at the University of Illinois
- Ritch Savin-Williams (BA 1971), professor of developmental psychology at Cornell University; prolific sexual orientation researcher
- Mohammad Shahidehpour, Carl Bodine Distinguished professor and chairman in the Electrical and Computer Engineering Department at Illinois Institute of Technology
- Mason Vaugh (BS 1919, B.Eng 1921), founder and head of the Department of Agricultural Engineering in Allahabad Agricultural Institute
- Lawrence Walkup (MA 1942, PhD 1948), president of Northern Arizona University
- Todd Whitaker (BS 1981, M.Ed. 1985, PhD 1992), professor of Educational Leadership, Indiana State University

== Art ==
- Shawn Krause (BFA 1992), animator of Pixar Animation Studios
- Betty Scarpino, wood sculptor
- Albert Schweitzer, cartoonist for the St. Louis Post-Dispatch
- Brendan Smialowski, photographer and photojournalist
- Mort Walker (BA 1948, ΚΣ), cartoonist; a life-sized bronze statue of his character Beetle Bailey sits in front of alumni center

== Business ==
- Andrew Cherng (MS 1972), founder of Panda Express and chairman of Panda Restaurant Group
- Alan C. Greenberg (BS BA 1949, ZBT), chairman, Bear Stearns Companies
- Edward D. "Ted" Jones (1947), managing partner of Edward Jones Investments
- R. Crosby Kemper (AB 1914, ΒΘΠ), former president and chairman, United Missouri Bancshares
- R. Crosby Kemper, Jr. (AB 1949, ΒΘΠ), former president and chairman, United Missouri Bancshares
- Richard Kinder (BA 1966, JD 1968, ΣΝ, QEBH), chairman and CEO of Kinder Morgan; former president of Enron; net worth of $10.2 billion; #39 on 2013 Forbes 400 list of richest Americans
- E. Stanley Kroenke (BS BA 1971, MBA 1973), chairman of THF Realty; owner of NBA's Denver Nuggets and NHL's Colorado Avalanche; co-owner of NFL's Los Angeles Rams; majority shareholder Arsenal FC; net worth of $3.5 billion, tied for #105 on 2008 Forbes 400 list of richest Americans
- Kenneth Lay (BA 1964, MA 1965, ΒΘΠ, ΟΔΚ, ΦΒΚ), former CEO of Enron
- Harry J. Lloyd (BJ 1950, TKE), founder of House of Lloyd and the upscale Loch Lloyd village and country club near Kansas City
- David C. Novak (BJ 1974, ΔΥ), chairman, CEO, and president, Yum! Brands, Inc.
- Rodger O. Riney (BS CiE 1968, MBA 1969, XE), founder of a brokerage firm
- Matthew K. Rose (BS BA 1981, ΛΧΑ), chairman, CEO, and president, Burlington Northern Santa Fe
- Roger Straus (1917–2004), co-founder and chairman of Farrar, Straus and Giroux
- Samuel M. Walton (BA 1940, ΒΘΠ, QEBH), founder of Walmart

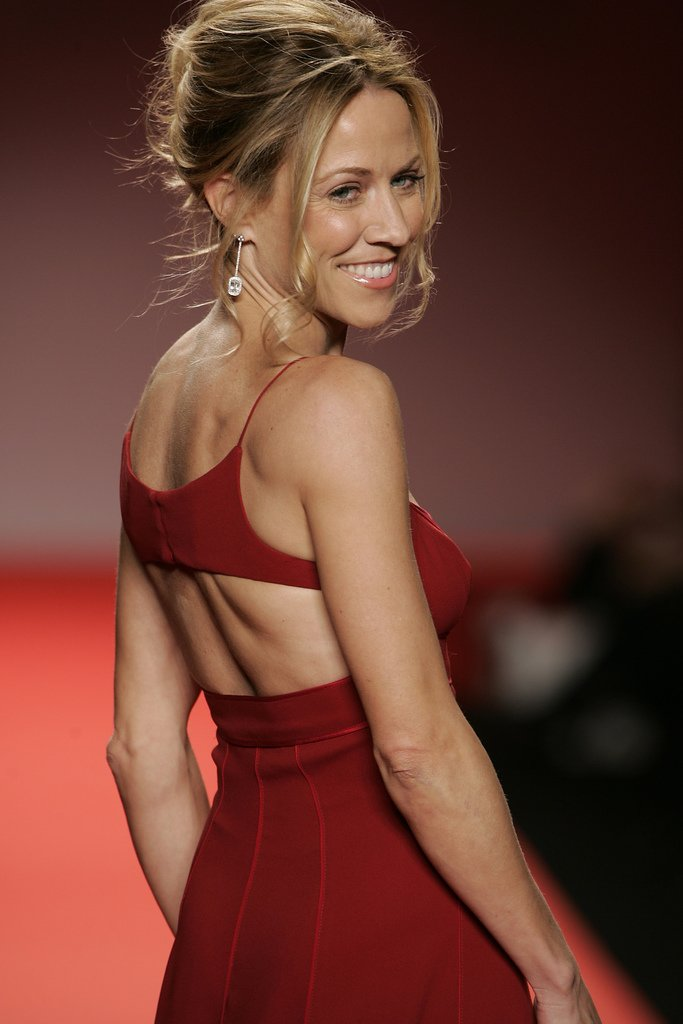
Sheryl Crow

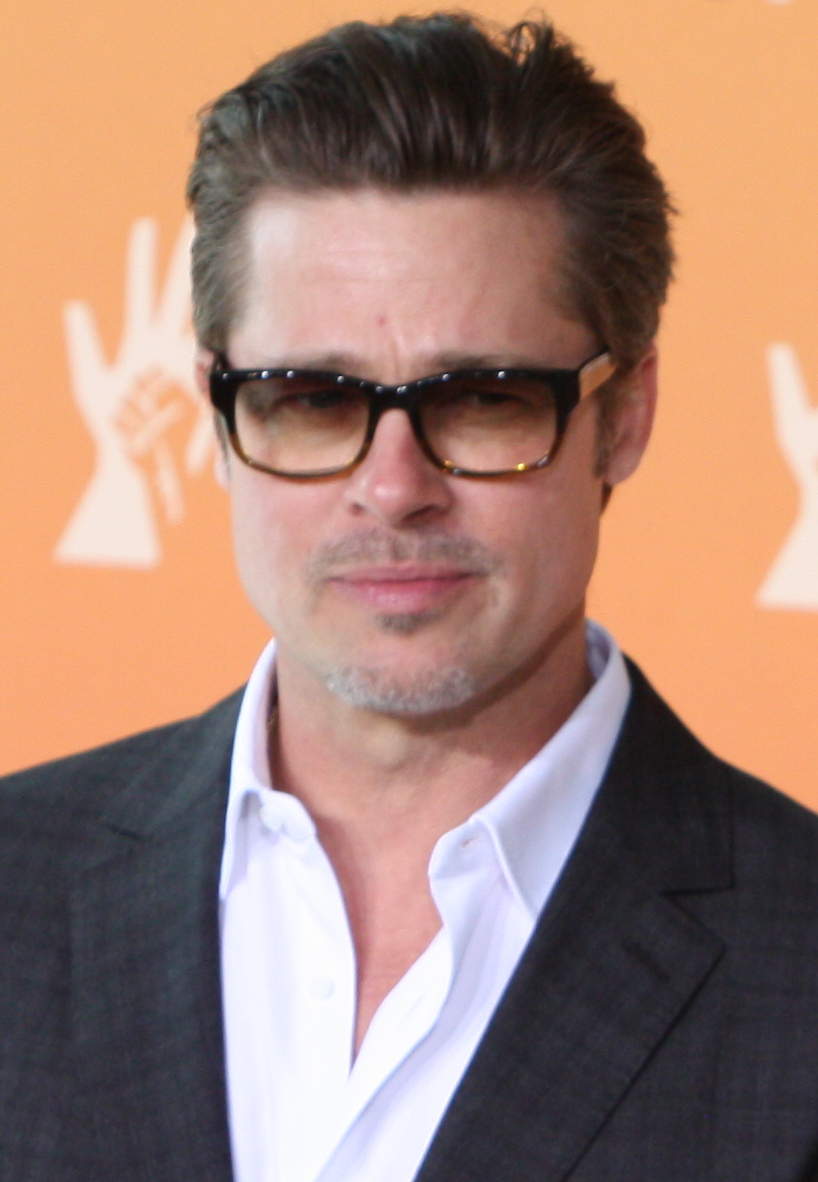
Brad Pitt

== Entertainment and television ==
- John Anderson (BJ 1987), ESPN SportsCenter host
- Tom Berenger, actor, Major League, The Big Chill, Platoon
- Linda Bloodworth-Thomason, writer and television producer
- Neal E. Boyd (BA 2001), opera singer; winner of America's Got Talent in 2008
- Brent Briscoe MU 1984, actor
- Kate Capshaw (BS 1975, MEd 1977, ΑΔΠ), actress, Willie Scott in Indiana Jones and the Temple of Doom
- Jann Carl (BJ 1982, ΚΚΓ), television personality, Entertainment Tonight
- Papa Joe Chevalier, host of nationally syndicated Papa Joe Show on the Sporting News Radio Network until 2005
- Sophia Choi, television anchor at CNN Headline News
- Chris Cooper (BGS 1976), Academy Award-winning actor, Adaptation
- Candice Crawford (BJ 2009, ΠΒΦ), Miss Missouri and Miss USA finalist; reporter for KDAF-TV
- Sheryl Crow (BS Ed 1984, ΚΑΘ, ΟΔΚ, SAI), musician, singer-songwriter
- Kelly Crull, sports anchor and reporter, Fox Sports South
- Hope Driskill (BA 2012, ΧΩ), Survivor: Caramoan, Miss Missouri USA 2011 and Miss USA Top 16 finalist
- Dave Fogel (ΣΧ), radio disc jockey
- Jason Forbach (BM 2000), actor, singer, playwright and filmmaker
- Martin Frost (BJ 1964, ZBT), political commentator, Fox News Channel
- Major Garrett (BJ 1984), national correspondent, Fox News Channel
- Heidi Gardner (never graduated), actress, Saturday Night Live
- Mike Hall, first winner of ESPN Dream Job series
- Jon Hamm (BA 1993), actor, Don Draper of AMC's Mad Men
- Tom Hart, play-by-play commentator for SEC Network and ESPN
- Sarah Hollins (BA 2013), Miss Nebraska USA 2016, TV personality
- Juliet Huddy, Fox News Channel host
- Jeffrey Crawford Jones, radio host
- Michael Kim, ESPNEWS host
- David Koechner, actor, Todd Packer of The Office, Champ Kind of Anchorman
- Dianne White Clatto, weathercaster
- Jim Lehrer (ΣΔΧ award), PBS news anchor
- David Limbaugh (BA 1975, JD 1978), political commentator and author
- Robert Loggia (BJ 1951 ΑΣΦ), actor, Jagged Edge, Big, Scarface, The Sopranos
- Robin Luke (PhD Business Administration and Marketing), a 1950s pop music singer known for the 1958 hit "Susie Darlin"; professor and department head, Marketing Department, Missouri State University
- Andrea Mackris, Fox News television producer
- Richard Matheson (BJ 1949, ΦΜΑ), screenwriter, author of I Am Legend, The Shrinking Man, What Dreams May Come
- Joel Meyers, sportscaster
- Greg Miller (BJ 2005), IGN cast member, host of Up at Noon, co-founder of Kinda Funny
- Russ Mitchell (BJ 1982), weekend anchor, CBS Evening News
- Jonathan Murray (BJ 1977), executive producer and co-creator of MTV's The Real World
- Lisa Myers (BJ 1973), television journalist, former senior investigative correspondent, NBC News
- Brad Pitt (ΣΧ, Journalism School, remains one credit short of graduation), actor and producer
- Elle Reeve (BJ 2005), correspondent for Vice News
- Chuck Roberts (BJ 1971), CNN news anchor
- SallyAnn Salsano, producer and creator of reality television shows for MTV including Jersey Shore
- Ed Sanders (dropout 1958), lead singer of the Fugs, social activist, author
- George C. Scott, Academy Award-winning actor, Patton, Dr. Strangelove, The Hustler, Anatomy of a Murder
- Jon Scott, Fox News Channel anchor
- Brad Sham (BJ 1970, ΑΕΠ), Dallas Cowboys Radio Network host
- Beatriz Sheridan, Mexican telenovela producer/director noted for Televisa
- Bob Sullivan, author and founding member of MSNBC
- Wright Thompson, ESPN senior writer
- Debbye Turner (DVM 1991), Miss America
- Elizabeth Vargas (BJ 1984), former ABC News anchor/correspondent and 20/20 co-anchor
- Matt Winer (BJ 1991, ΠΚΑ), ESPN SportsCenter host
- Ying Da, actor and director
- Nick Young, CBS radio news anchor
- Greg Warren, stand up comic.

== Law ==
- John R. Gibson (BA 1949, JD 1952, TKE, QEBH, ΟΔΚ, ΦΒΚ), Senior Judge, U.S. Court of Appeals for the Eighth Circuit
- Stephen N. Limbaugh Sr. (1951 ΒΘΠ), U.S. Federal District Court judge; former president of the Missouri Bar Association
- Kimbrough Stone (1895, ΒΘΠ), judge of the U.S. Circuit Court of Appeals, Eighth Circuit
- Robert Barr Todd, justice of the Louisiana Supreme Court
- Kathleen Zellner, attorney

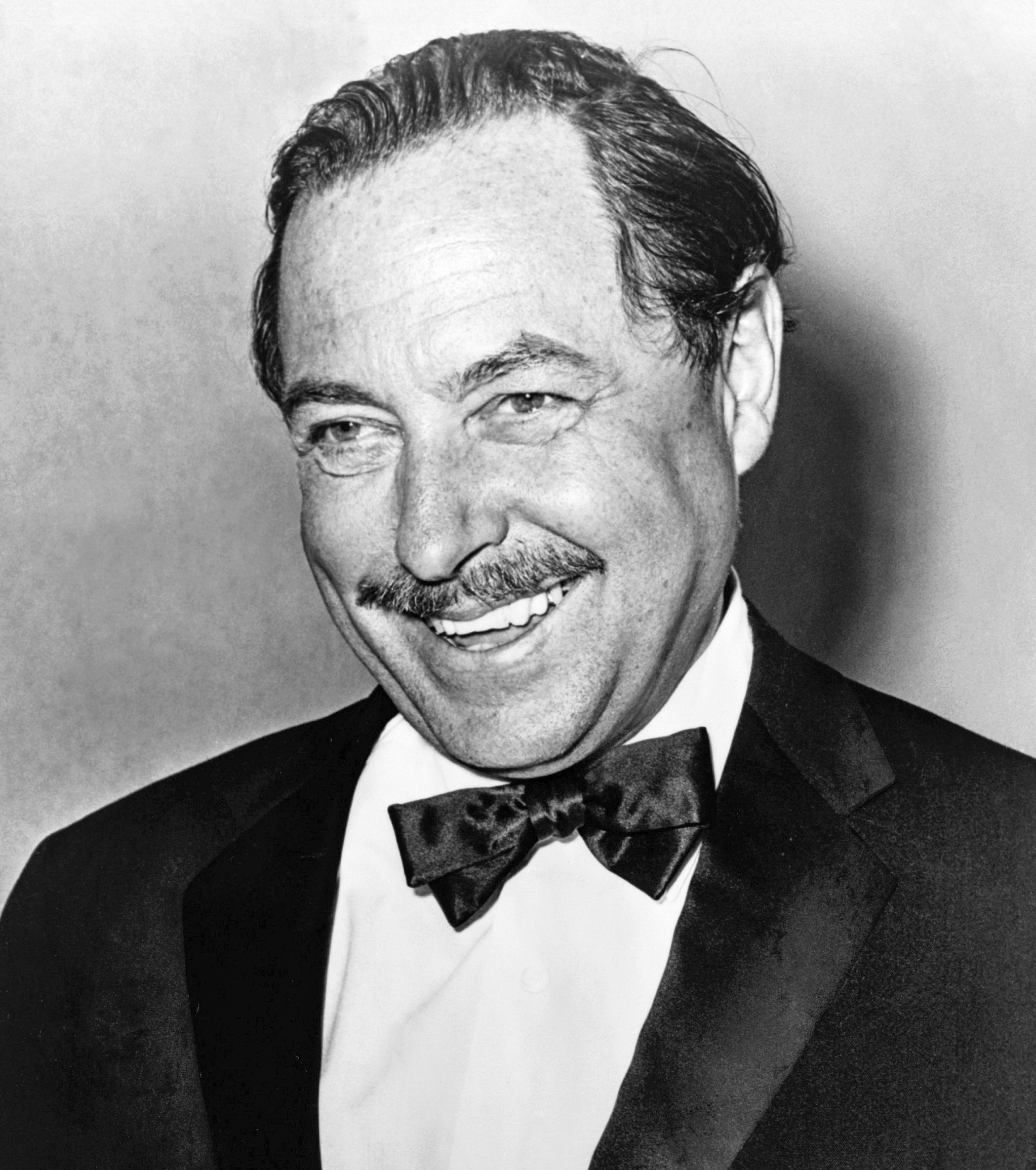
Tennessee Williams

== Literature and journalism ==
- Lori Borgman, nationally distributed columnist, author and speaker
- Gerald M. Boyd, former managing editor of The New York Times
- Russ Buettner, Pulitzer Prize-winning investigative reporter for The New York Times
- Barney Calame (ΒΘΠ), public editor, New York Times
- Hal Call, pioneering LGBT rights activist and gay publisher/pornographer
- Jeffery Deaver (BJ 1972), author of the Lincoln Rhyme series
- Lewis Diuguid (BJ 1977); author and journalist
- Clarence Faulk (BJ c. 1931), publisher of Ruston Daily Leader and founder of radio station KRUS
- Pat Forde, Yahoo Sports columnist
- Jay Greenberg, sports journalist and winner of the Elmer Ferguson Memorial Award
- William Least Heat-Moon (BA 1961, MA 1962, PhD 1973, BJ 1978, ΤΚΕ), author
- Rebecca Johns (BA 1993, BJ 1993), author
- James J. Kilpatrick (BJ 1941), conservative columnist
- Ah Jook Ku (1935), former Associated Press correspondent, first Asian American female reporter for Honolulu Star-Bulletin
- Harris Merton Lyon, short-story writer
- Marijane Meaker (BA 1949 ΑΔΠ), novelist
- Thomas Franklin Fairfax Millard (ΒΘΠ), journalist and newspaper editor
- Pamela Morsi, author
- Suniti Namjoshi, writer
- Ken Paulson, editor, USA Today
- Marjorie Paxson, influential women's page editor
- Doc Quigg, journalist for United Press International
- Marcus Eli Ravage, journalist and author; honorary Phi Beta Kappa inductee at the University of Missouri (1933)
- Ben Robertson (1926), WWII war correspondent, New York Herald Tribune; author
- James Rollins, aka James Czajkowski, author of bestselling Sigma Force series
- Austin Ruse, columnist, author, political activist
- Jackson Scholz, Olympic gold medalist, popular author of juvenile sports fiction
- Ram Subhag Singh, Indian politician, first Leader of the Opposition in Lok Sabha
- Edgar Snow (ΒΘΠ), main Western journalist in Mao's China
- Lee Strobel (BJ 1974), journalist and author of The Case for Christ series
- George Woodward Warder (BA circa 1866), poet and author
- Lonnie Wheeler, sportswriter and author; worked for The Cincinnati Enquirer and The Cincinnati Post
- John Edward Williams (PHD 1954), recipient of National Book Award, author of Stoner and Augustus
- Tennessee Williams (ΑΤΩ), playwright, The Glass Menagerie, A Streetcar Named Desire, Cat on a Hot Tin Roof
- Grace Steele Woodward, writer and historian
- Thomas Jefferson Young, novelist

== Military ==
- Huda Salih Mahdi Ammash (1970), member of Regional Command of the Arab Socialist Ba'ath Party – Iraq Region, chemical weapons expert
- Marcus B. Bell, U.S. Army brigadier general
- Gen. Fred F. Castle Jr. (1970 and 1977), Vietnam War and Gulf War
- Major General Roger E. Combs (1968 and 1975), assistant adjutant general-Air Missouri National Guard, director of Strategic Plans and Policy (J-5), National Guard Bureau
- Gen. Enoch Crowder (1886, ΒΘΠ), Spanish–American War, Philippine–American War, World War I general
- Lt General Mark A. Ediger (1978), Surgeon General of Air Force
- Lieutenant General Charles D. Franklin (1953), commander of First United States Army 1984–1987
- Brigadeführer Gustav Lombard (1913), Nazi Waffen SS, held commands in first 8th SS Cavalry Division Florian Geyer and later 31st SS Volunteer Grenadier Division, awarded Knight's Cross of Iron Cross
- Colonel Arthur D. Simons (1941), distinguished service in World War II, Korean War, and Vietnam War; ranger patriarch; leader of Son Tay Raid
- Rear Admiral Kelly E. Taggart (1955), second director of National Oceanic and Atmospheric Administration Commissioned Officer Corps
- Lieutenant Stephen W. Thompson, first person in US military history to shoot down an enemy aircraft
- Colonel F. D. Wickham (1893, ΒΘΠ), Spanish–American War, Philippine–American War, World War I; helped found Kappa Kappa Psi band fraternity at Oklahoma A&M College

== Politics and government ==
- Huda Salih Mahdi Ammash (PHD 1983), Iraqi scientist and microbiologist; former member of Iraq's Revolutionary Command Council
- Emily Newell Blair, writer, suffragist, national Democratic Party political leader, co-founder of the League of Women Voters, feminist
- Russ Carnahan (BS 1979, JD 1983, KA), U.S. congressman
- Paul Coverdell (ΦΚΨ), former U.S. senator (GA); died 2000
- William S. Cowherd (1881, ΒΘΠ), mayor of Kansas City, Missouri 1892–1893 and U.S. congressman from Missouri 1897–1905
- William B. Cravens (1893, ΒΘΠ), former U.S. representative from Missouri
- Thomas T. Crittenden Jr. (1882, ΒΘΠ), former mayor of Kansas City, Missouri 1908–1909
- Elgin English Crull (1930, Kappa Sigma), longest serving city manager of Dallas, Texas to date (1952–1966); city manager when Kennedy was assassinated
- Randy "Duke" Cunningham, former U.S. congressman from California who resigned in 2005 amid a massive bribery scandal
- Gen. Donald Dawson (1932, ΒΘΠ), a former aide to President Truman, Curator of the Truman Presidential Library
- Hon. Harsha de Silva (MA and PhD, 1993), Sri Lankan Member of Parliament
- James H. Faulkner, Alabama politician, newspaper publisher, and business leader
- Martin Frost (BJ 1964, ZBT), former U.S. congressman
- Nicole Galloway (master's degree in business administration), state auditor of Missouri
- Jack Goodman (BA 1995, JD 1998), state senator, practicing attorney in Mount Vernon, MO
- Sam Graves (BS 1986, ΑΓΣ), U.S. congressman
- John N. Griesemer (BS 1953), governor of the United States Postal Service
- Bob F. Griffin (JD 1958), speaker of Missouri House of Representatives for 15 years
- Jason Grill, Missouri House of Representatives (2006–2010)
- Chuck Gross (BA 1981, MPA 1982), Missouri state senator
- Kate Hanley, née Keith (BA 1965, BS 1965, ΦΒΚ), Virginia politician
- Bill Hardwick (BA 2006, JD 2011), Missouri state legislator
- Martin Heinrich (BS 1995), former U.S. congressman and current U.S. senator from New Mexico
- Jay Houghton, Republican member of the Missouri House of Representatives
- Kenny Hulshof (BA 1980, Farmhouse, Mystical 7), former U.S. congressman
- James P. Kem (1910, ΒΘΠ), US senator from Missouri, 1947–1953
- Jason Klumb (JD 1993), regional administrator of the U.S. General Services Administration
- Rush Limbaugh Sr. (1914), Missouri House of Representatives
- Jon Lindgren, mayor of Fargo, North Dakota, 1978–1994; pioneering LGBT supporter
- Jerry Lon Litton (B.S. Journalism 1961, ΑΓΡ), U.S. representative from Missouri's 6th Congressional District (1972–1976); killed in a plane crash after winning the 1976 Democratic nomination for U.S. senator from Missouri; favored to be the Democratic nominee for president; host of the TV show Dialogue with Litton
- Themba N. Masuku, acting Prime Minister of Eswatini
- Claire McCaskill (AB 1975, JD 1978, ΚΑΘ, QEBH), former Missouri state auditor and former senior U.S. Senator from Missouri
- Walter McCormick (BJ 1976; JD 1979; ΑΤΩ, ΟΔΚ, Mystical 7), president and CEO of United States Telecom Association; former general counsel of U.S. Department of Transportation; U.S. Senate Commerce Committee
- Morgan McGarvey, U.S. representative from Kentucky
- James B. Potter Jr., Los Angeles City Council member, 1963–71
- Clarke Reed, Mississippi state Republican chairman, 1966–1976; instrumental in the nomination of Gerald R. Ford, at the 1976 Republican National Convention in Kansas City; Greenville, Mississippi businessman
- Jody Richards, member and former speaker of the Kentucky House of Representatives
- Charles Griffith Ross, press secretary for President Harry S. Truman
- Thomas L. Rubey (1885, ΒΘΠ), former U.S. representative from Missouri
- Sally Shelton-Colby, ambassador to Grenada and Barbados 1979–1981
- Tom Shively, member of Missouri House of Representatives
- Ram Subhag Singh, Indian politician and the first Leader of the Opposition in Lok Sabha
- Ike Skelton (AB 1953, JD 1956, ΣΧ, ΦΒΚ, QEBH), former U.S. congressman; former chairman of the House Armed Services Committee
- Brian Treece, mayor of Columbia, Missouri
- Carl M. Vogel, member of both houses of the Missouri State Legislature; from Jefferson City

=== Governors ===
- James T. Blair Jr., Missouri governor 1957–61
- Mel Carnahan, Missouri governor 1993–2000, only person elected U.S. senator posthumously
- John M. Dalton (ΦΓΔ), Missouri governor 1961–65
- Forrest C. Donnell (ΚΣ, ΦΔΦ, ΦΒΚ, ΘΚΝ, QEBH), Missouri governor 1945–51
- Warren E. Hearnes (QEBH), Missouri governor 1965–73, namesake of Hearnes Center
- William Jayne, first governor of Dakota Territory
- Tim Kaine (QEBH), governor of Virginia 2006–10, U.S. senator and 2016 Democratic vice presidential nominee
- Ted Kulongoski (undergraduate and law degrees), governor of Oregon 2003–11
- Jay Nixon, Missouri governor 2009–17
- Guy B. Park (ΒΘΠ), Missouri governor 1933–37
- Roger B. Wilson, Missouri governor 2000–01

== Religion ==
- Edward N. Peters (JD, 1982), Catholic canonist and blogger

== Science and technology ==
- Huda Salih Mahdi Ammash (Ph.D. 1983), WMD scientist for Saddam Hussein, one of 55 most wanted Iraqis post-Coalition invasion
- William F. Baker (BS CiE '75), chief structural engineer of Burj Khalifa, world's tallest man-made structure
- Gerald J. Fishman (BS 1965, ΑΕΠ), research astrophysicist specializing in gamma-ray astronomy
- Linda Godwin (MS 1976, PhD 1980), NASA astronaut
- Nancy E. Goeken (PhD 1972), immunologist
- Susan Golden (Ph.D. 1983), National Academy of Sciences member and professor of Molecular Biology at University of California, San Diego
- Charles Claude Guthrie (MD 1901), physiologist and researcher
- Mary Jane Guthrie (BA 1916, MA 1918), zoologist and cancer researcher, also a University of Missouri faculty member
- Ernest Lenard Hall (BS EE 1965, MS 1966, PhD 1971), roboticist
- Hope Hibbard (undergraduate degree, 1916, MS 1918), biologist, cytologist, zoologist, and professor of zoology
- Thomas Jefferson Jackson See (BS 1889, valedictorian), controversial astronomer; critic; opponent of Einstein
- William Langston, founder and CEO of Parkinson's Institute and Clinical Center in Sunnyvale, California
- Richard N. Richards (BS ChE 1969, ΛΧΑ), NASA astronaut
- Frederick Chapman Robbins (M.D. 1954), Nobel Prize recipient, with John Enders and Thomas Weller for the cultivation of human viruses (polio) in tissue culture
- Herschel Roman (PhD 1942), early pioneer in yeast genetics
- William C. Schwartz (MA 1951), physicist, laser pioneer, and founder of International Laser Systems
- Harlow Shapley (AB 1910, AM 1911), astronomer; used RR Lyrae stars to correctly estimate the size of the Milky Way Galaxy and the sun's position within it
- Larry Smarr (BA 1970, MS 1970), physicist; founding director of the National Center for Supercomputing Applications
- William Jasper Spillman (B.S. 1886, M.S. 1890), wheat geneticist, founder, agricultural economics
- Laura Sullivan-Beckers (PhD 2008), biologist
- Raymond E. Zirkle (B.A.1928; Ph.D. 1932), radiobiologist and principle of the Manhattan Project

== Sports ==
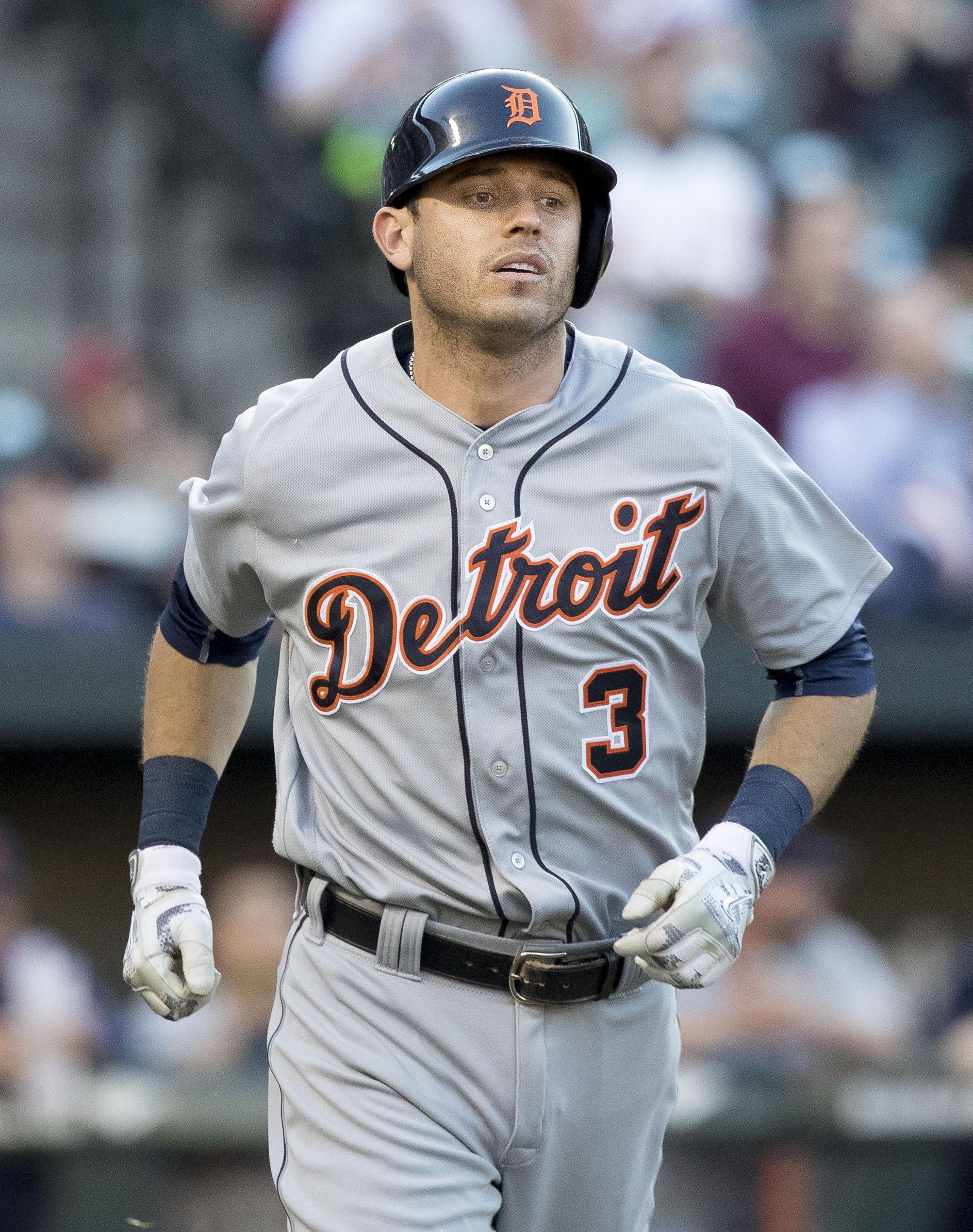
Ian Kinsler

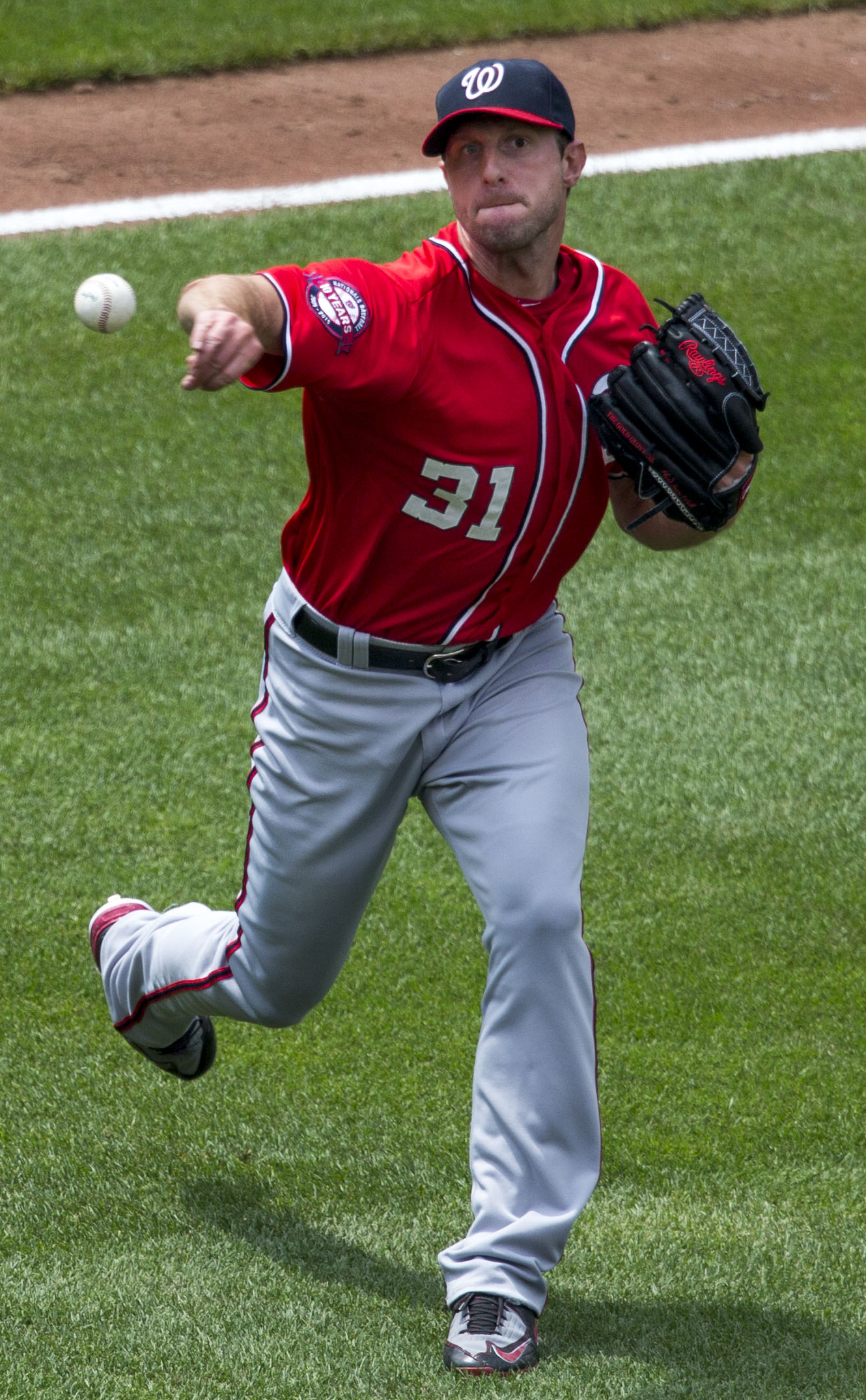
Max Scherzer

=== Baseball ===
- Joe Bennett, MLB player
- Phil Bradley (Mystical 7), former MLB player, also played football
- Skip Caray, former broadcaster for Atlanta Braves; son of Harry Caray
- Jeff Cornell, former MLB pitcher
- Aaron Crow, MLB pitcher
- John Dettmer, former MLB pitcher
- Pete Fairbanks, pitcher for Tampa Bay Rays
- David Freese, former MLB third baseman-first baseman, 2011 NLCS and World Series MVP and Babe Ruth Award winner for St. Louis Cardinals
- Kyle Gibson, MLB All-Star pitcher for Philadelphia Phillies
- Tanner Houck, pitcher for Boston Red Sox
- Ian Kinsler, former All-Star MLB second baseman
- Tim Laudner, former MLB catcher
- Reggie McClain, MLB pitcher for the Seattle Mariners
- Kameron Misner, outfielder for Tampa Bay Rays
- Dave Otto, former MLB pitcher
- Max Scherzer, MLB All-Star pitcher for Los Angeles Dodgers, 3-time Cy Young Award winner (2013, 2016, 2017)
- Jerry Schoonmaker, former MLB outfielder, also played football
- Art Shamsky, former MLB outfielder and Israel Baseball League manager
- Mike Shannon (attended), MLB infielder for St. Louis Cardinals, 2-time World Series champion and broadcaster
- Sonny Siebert, former MLB pitcher, 2-time All-Star
- Dave Silvestri, former MLB infielder
- Gene Stephenson, former Wichita State University baseball head coach, also played football
- Nick Tepesch, pitcher for Texas Rangers
- Jayce Tingler, manager for San Diego Padres

=== Basketball ===
- Jabari Brown, CBA player for Foshan Dralions
- John Brown, former NBA player for Atlanta Hawks, Chicago Bulls
- DeMarre Carroll, former NBA player for San Antonio Spurs
- Jordan Clarkson, current NBA player for New York Knicks
- Sophie Cunningham, current WNBA player for Indiana Fever and former WNBL player for Melbourne Boomers
- Marcus Denmon, TBL player for Istanbul BB
- Keyon Dooling, former NBA player for Boston Celtics
- Larry Drew, former NBA player, former head coach for Atlanta Hawks and Milwaukee Bucks
- Al Eberhard, former NBA player for Detroit Pistons
- Kim English, former NBA player and head basketball coach for the Providence Friars
- JaKeenan Gant, player for Hapoel Be'er Sheva of the Israeli Basketball Premier League
- Thomas Gardner, former NBA player for Atlanta Hawks
- Linas Kleiza, former NBA player
- Gary Leonard, former NBA player
- Anthony Peeler, former NBA player for Los Angeles Lakers
- Michael Porter Jr., current NBA player for Brooklyn Nets
- Phil Pressey, former NBA player for Boston Celtics
- Kareem Rush, former NBA player for Los Angeles Clippers
- Doug Smith, former NBA player
- Dru Smith, current NBA player for the Miami Heat
- Norm Stewart (BA 1956, ΒΘΠ, Mystical 7), All-American and former head coach at Northern Iowa (1961–67) and Mizzou (1967–99)
- Steve Stipanovich, former NBA player
- Tyler Stone (born 1991), basketball player in the Israeli Basketball Premier League
- Jon Sundvold, former NBA player for San Antonio Spurs, Miami Heat

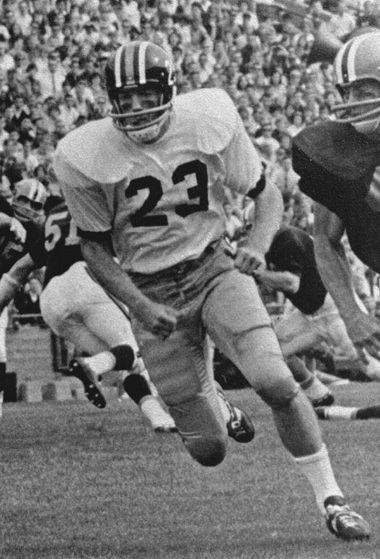
Roger Wehrli

=== Football ===
- Bud Abell, former American Football League player for the Kansas City Chiefs
- Danario Alexander, former NFL player for San Diego Chargers
- Russ Ball, executive with Green Bay Packers
- Gary Barnett (1969, ΒΘΠ), former head football coach at Northwestern and Colorado
- Dwayne Blakley, former NFL tight end
- Nick Bolton, NFL player for the Kansas City Chiefs
- Justin Britt, offensive lineman for Seattle Seahawks
- Charlie Brown, NFL player for New Orleans Saints
- Colin Brown, NFL player for Buffalo Bills
- Luther Burden III, NFL player for Chicago Bears
- Lloyd Carr (ΚΣ), former head coach University of Michigan
- Byron Chamberlain, former NFL player
- Paul Christman (ΚΣ), College Football Hall of Famer, former NFL player and broadcaster
- Chase Coffman, NFL player, John Mackey Award winner
- DeMontie Cross, assistant coach with Wisconsin Badgers
- Sean Culkin, NFL player
- Chase Daniel, NFL player for Chicago Bears
- Robert Delpino, former NFL player
- Kony Ealy, defensive lineman for New York Jets
- Brad Edelman, former NFL player
- Atiyyah Ellison, NFL player for Kansas City Chiefs
- Don Faurot (1924 Farmhouse, Mystical 7), MU coach and player
- Ron Fellows, former NFL player
- Will Franklin, former NFL player
- Blaine Gabbert, NFL player for Arizona Cardinals
- Andrew Gachkar, NFL player with San Diego Chargers
- Justin Gage, former NFL player
- E.J. Gaines, NFL player for Los Angeles Rams
- Tony Galbreath, former NFL player
- Markus Golden, NFL player for Arizona Cardinals
- Mel Gray (Mystical 7), former NFL player
- Dorial Green-Beckham, NFL player for Tennessee Titans
- Ziggy Hood, NFL player for Jacksonville Jaguars
- Harry Ice (ΒΘΠ), MVP of the 1942 Sugar Bowl, a longtime member of the athletic department
- Brad Imes, football player; appeared on The Ultimate Fighter 2, retired professional mixed martial arts fighter
- Jim Jennings, former NFL player
- Mike Jones, former NFL player
- Henry Josey, former NFL player
- Jim Kekeris, former NFL player
- Jim Leavitt, former head coach of University of South Florida
- Leo Lewis, former NFL player
- Drew Lock, NFL player and Super Bowl champion for Seattle Seahawks
- Rick Lyle, former NFL player
- Bill McCartney, former head coach at University of Colorado
- Jeremy Maclin, NFL player for Kansas City Chiefs
- Henry Marshall, former NFL player
- Steve Martin, former NFL player
- John Matuszak, former NFL player for Oakland Raiders
- Ron McBride, former NFL player
- Erik McMillan, former NFL player
- Armand Membou, current NFL player for New York Jets
- William Moore, NFL player for Atlanta Falcons
- Mitch Morse, NFL player for Kansas City Chiefs
- C. J. Mosley, NFL player for Cleveland Browns
- Damien Nash, former NFL player
- Brock Olivo, former NFL player
- Gus Otto (ΒΘΠ), former NFL player
- Francis Peay, former NFL player
- Kurt Petersen, former NFL player
- Johnnie Poe, former NFL player
- Shane Ray, NFL player for Denver Broncos
- Howard Richards (Kappa Alpha Psi), former NFL player, Dallas Cowboys
- Johnny Roland (Kappa Alpha Psi), former NFL coach and player
- Martin Rucker, NFL player for Philadelphia Eagles
- Andy Russell, former NFL player
- Jerome Sally, former NFL player
- Michael Sam, former NFL player for St. Louis Rams, first openly gay player in NFL
- George Seals, former NFL player
- Aldon Smith, NFL player for San Francisco 49ers
- Brad Smith, NFL player for Philadelphia Eagles
- Justin Smith, NFL player for San Francisco 49ers
- Otis Smith, former NFL player
- Ray Smith, NFL player
- David Smukler, NFL player
- Hugh Sprinkle, NFL player
- Stryker Sulak, NFL player for Green Bay Packers
- Morris Towns, former NFL player
- Bruce Van Dyke, former NFL player
- L'Damian Washington, wide receiver for San Francisco 49ers
- Russ Washington, former NFL player
- Sean Weatherspoon, NFL player for Atlanta Falcons
- Roger Wehrli, seven-time Pro Bowl NFL player in Pro Football Hall of Fame
- Bill Whitaker, former NFL player
- James Wilder Sr., former NFL player
- Kellen Winslow, college and Pro Football Hall of Fame player
- Eric Wright, former NFL player

=== Wrestling ===
- Ben Askren, two-time NCAA wrestling champion (2006, 2007); 2008 Olympian; retired MMA fighter; former Bellator Welterweight Champion
- Evan Bourne, professional wrestler
- Michael Chandler, 2009 NCAA Wrestling All-American (5th place, 157 lbs.), former Bellator Lightweight Champion
- J'den Cox, three-time NCAA champion wrestler, 2016 Olympic bronze medalist in 86 kg weight class
- Sammie Henson, two-time NCAA wrestling champion; 1998 world freestyle champion; 2000 Olympic silver medalist; 2006 world bronze medalist at age 36
- J. P. Reese, two-time NCAA wrestling championships qualifier (2002 and 2003); MMA fighter
- Gene Snitsky, professional wrestler
- Mike Whitehead (attended), three-time All-American wrestler; MMA fighter
- Tyron Woodley, two-time NCAA Division I All-American wrestler; mixed martial artist in welterweight division, champion for Ultimate Fighting Championship

=== Other sports ===
- Dick Ault, Olympic hurdler
- Christian Cantwell, shot putter, 2004 IAAF World Indoor Champion, 2008 Olympic silver medalist, 2009 IAAF World Outdoor Champion
- Carl Edwards, NASCAR driver and 2007 Busch Series champion (attended but did not graduate)
- Ross Miner (born 1991), skating coach and retired competitive figure skater
- Derrick Peterson (ΑΚΛ), professional runner, 2004 Olympian
- Jackson Scholz, 1920/24/28 Olympic sprinter, gold medalist, portrayed in Chariots of Fire (1981)
- Karissa Schweizer, runner, seven-time NCAA National Champion
- Chelsea Thomas, softball player, SEC Pitcher of the Year

== Other ==
- Thomas Doty, Continental Airlines Flight 11 suicide bomber

== See also ==
- List of people from Columbia, Missouri
