= George Bates =

George Bates may refer to:

- George Bates (physician) (1608–1668), physician to Oliver Cromwell and to Charles II, Fellow of the Royal Society, author
- George Bates (Australian footballer) (1914–1983), Australian rules footballer
- George Bates (English footballer) (1923–1995), English footballer
- George J. Bates (1891–1949), U.S. Representative from Massachusetts
- George E. Bates (bishop) (1933–1999), bishop of the Episcopal Diocese of Utah
- George Hubert Bates (1884–1978), State Treasurer of Missouri
- George Latimer Bates (1863–1940), American naturalist
- George E. Bates (professor) (1902–1992), American professor of investment management
- George Bates (wheelchair basketball) (born 1994), British wheelchair basketball player
