= Śmiałowski =

Śmiałowski (Polish pronunciation: [ɕmʲaˈwɔfskʲi]; feminine: Śmiałowska; plural: Śmiałowscy) is a Polish surname. Notable people with the name Śmiałowski/Smialowski include:

- Brendan Smialowski (born c. 1981), American photographer
- Igor Śmiałowski (1917–2006), Polish actor

== See also ==
- Śmiłowski
