= Raymond Ackerman =

Raymond Ackerman may refer to:

- Raymond Ackerman (filmmaker) or C. Fred Ackerman (1873–1938), American journalist and filmmaker
- Raymond Ackerman (businessman) (1931–2023), South African businessman
