= John W. Powell =

American journalist

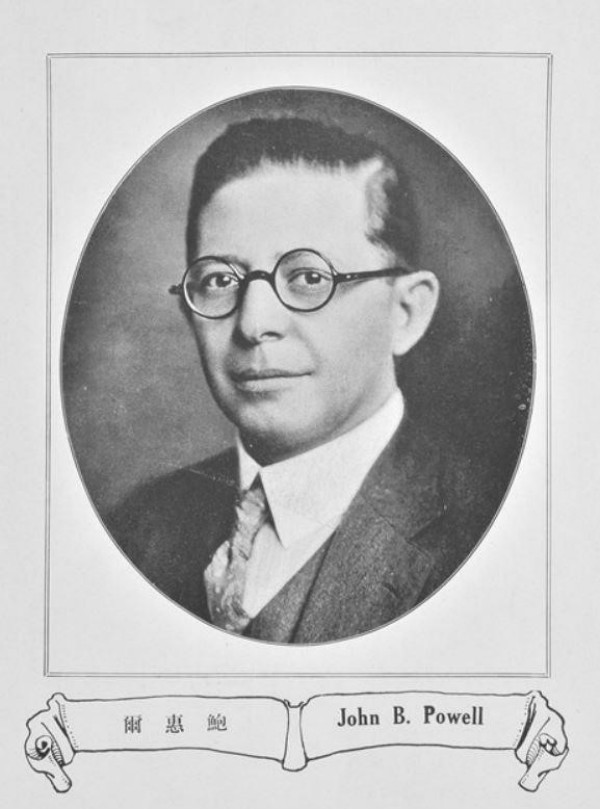
- Born: July 3, 1919; Shanghai, China
- Died: December 15, 2008 (aged 89); San Francisco, US
- Education: University of Missouri
- Spouse: Sylvia Powell
- Father: John Benjamin Powell

John William Powell (July 3, 1919 – December 15, 2008) was a journalist and small business proprietor who edited the China Weekly Review, an English-language journal first published by his father, John B. Powell in Shanghai.

John W. Powell was tried for sedition in 1959 after publishing an article that reported on allegations made by Mainland Chinese officials that the United States and Japan were carrying out germ warfare in the Korean War. In 1956, the Eisenhower Administration's Department of Justice pressed sedition charges against Powell, his wife Sylvia, and Julian Schuman, after federal prosecutors secured grand jury indictments against them for publishing allegations of bacteriological warfare. However, the prosecutors failed to get any convictions. The defendants invoked their Constitutional right to refuse to reveal self-incriminating evidence, and U.S. Department of Defense officials also refused to provide any incriminating archives or witnesses. This information was not revealed until decades later as a result of Freedom of Information Act requests.

All three of the defendants were acquitted of all charges over the next six years, after a Federal judge dismissed the core aspects of the case against them in 1959, due to obviously insufficient evidence against them.

== Early life and career ==
Powell was born in Shanghai, China, in 1919. One year later, Powell's parents decided that Shanghai was unsafe for their infant, so they sent him to live with his mother's family in Hannibal, Missouri. In 1917, Powell's father, John Benjamin Powell, had been a co-founder of the tiny publication, the China Weekly Review (originally Thomas Franklin Fairfax Millard’s Review of the Far East, 1922 renamed Weekly Review of the Far East, 1923 renamed The China Weekly Review, retaining the Chinese heading Mìlè Pínglúnbào 《密勒評論報》, i.e. “Millard’s Review”), modeled after the influential American political journals The New Republic and The Nation, and which featured original reporting, reports on Chinese subjects, and editorials.

Interrupting his journalism studies at the University of Missouri, Powell rejoined his father at the China Weekly Review. After the Japanese Attack on Pearl Harbor, Powell joined the American Office of War Information, the military's journalism program, as a news editor. In 1943, Powell was sent to Chongqing, China, a city in far southwestern China (and the wartime capital of Free China), where he remained for the rest of the war. For eight years after World War II, from 1945 until June, 1953, Powell published his journal, first as the "China Weekly Review" and later on, when its revenues declined greatly, as the "China Monthly Review". While in China, Powell was an advocate for Chinese sovereignty and was a supporter of Chinese president Cao Kun.

== Sedition allegations ==
During the Red-baiting 1950s, the Federal government initially accused Powell and his wife of treason. On April 26, 1956, the Powells, along with an associate at the "China Monthly Review", learned that a Federal Grand Jury had indicted each of them on a charge of sedition. Each count in the indictment was punishable by up to twenty years in prison and up to $10,000 in fines. The most damaging charge was that the defendants had falsely reported that the United States had engaged in bacteriological warfare during the Korean War, and that North Koreans had forced American Prisoners of War to read published reports of these charges as part of their indoctrination processes and brainwashing.

In their coverage of the breaking news, the San Francisco Chronicle newspaper, among other news publications, used two-inch-high bold type on its front page, exclaiming "S.F. JURY INDICTS WRITER – SEDITION". The grand jury had charged Powell with a dozen counts of sedition and a count of conspiring to commit sedition. His wife, Sylvia and Julian Schuman, who had been Powell's associate editor, were also charged with a single count of conspiracy, each. The Powells responded to the charges by asserting they had properly reported on what was said by Chinese officials and troops coming from the front lines of the Korean War.

Powell's trial, which ended in a mistrial, took place in 1959 at the Federal Courthouse in San Francisco, the same location where Marie Equi had been tried and convicted of sedition in 1918. The treason charges against Powell were formally dismissed in July, 1959, and two years later, in 1961, Attorney General Robert F. Kennedy finally dropped the rest of the sedition charges.

=== Later developments ===
Although direct official evidence such as military records and similar documentation that bacteriological warfare was employed during the Korean War by either side does not exist, some contend that there is overwhelming indirect and unofficial evidence that the US used biological weapons during this war. In an effort to advocate his opinions about American involvement in bacteriological warfare in Asia, Powell published an article titled "Japan's Germ Warfare: The U.S. Cover-up of a War Crime" in the October/December, 1980, issue of the "Bulletin of Concerned Asian Scholars". An editor from the United Press International had told Powell his story was "old news," and it was not published by mainstream publications.

However, with the documents that he had obtained under the Freedom of Information Act, Powell was able to provide additional evidence supporting his earlier reports in the "China Monthly Review". The second article, "Japan's Biological Weapons, 1930-1945," was published in the October 1981 edition of The Bulletin of the Atomic Scientists. It wasn't until 1989 that a detailed account of the Japanese bacteriological warfare experiments in China appeared. The British journalists Peter Williams and David Wallace published their book, "Unit 731: Japan's Secret of Secrets" (London: Hodder and Stoughton). [Also published in New York City that same year as "Unit 731: Japan's Secret Biological Warfare in World War II"]. Even in the 21st Century, 60 years after the Japanese bacteriological warfare camps, American intelligence agencies and the Department of Defense still withhold certain information about the World War II Japanese program in China.

Powell's articles in The Bulletin of the Atomic Scientists eventually led to the broadcast of segments on the CBS-TV investigative news program 60 Minutes and ABC-TV's 20/20 program. Powell's reporting had brought widespread public attention to the use of bacteriological warfare, which helped prompt the United States Congress into hearing testimony from former American Prisoners of War in 1982 and 1986.

== Personal life ==
Powell met his wife Sylvia Powell in 1947, while he was in Shanghai opening up a news bureau for the Office of War Information, and they were married soon afterwards.

After returning to the United States from China, the Powells bought an old house on Potrero Hill in San Francisco, undertook extensive repairs and renovations, and then sold it for a profit. They next settled into a pattern of buying, rehabilitating, and reselling fourteen houses and several apartment buildings. "It was kind of rough," John Powell said, "Obviously, I couldn't get a job on a newspaper. I tried various things, working as a salesman, selling teaching aids to schools."

Eventually, the Powells bought a house on Church Street, in San Francisco's Mission District, and lived there for thirty years. This house had a storefront where they also ran an antiques shop and remodeled Victorian homes for about fifteen years as a result of Powell being "blackballed" due to his alleged sedition.

Powell died on December 15, 2008, in San Francisco at the age of 89 as a result of complications from pneumonia.

== See also ==
- Allegations of biological warfare in the Korean War

== Selected publications ==
- A Plague Upon Humanity: The Secret Genocide of Axis Japan's Germ Warfare Operation, Daniel Barenblatt, New York: HarperCollins, 2004, ISBN 0-06-018625-9
- The United States and Biological Warfare: Secrets from the Early Cold War and Korea, Stephen Endicott and Edward Hagerman, Bloomington: Indiana University Press, 1998
- Unit 731: The Japanese Army's Secret of Secrets, Peter Williams and David Wallace, London: Hodder and Stoughton, 1989. Also published in the United States in 1989 as: Unit 731: Japan's Secret Biological Warfare in World War II.
