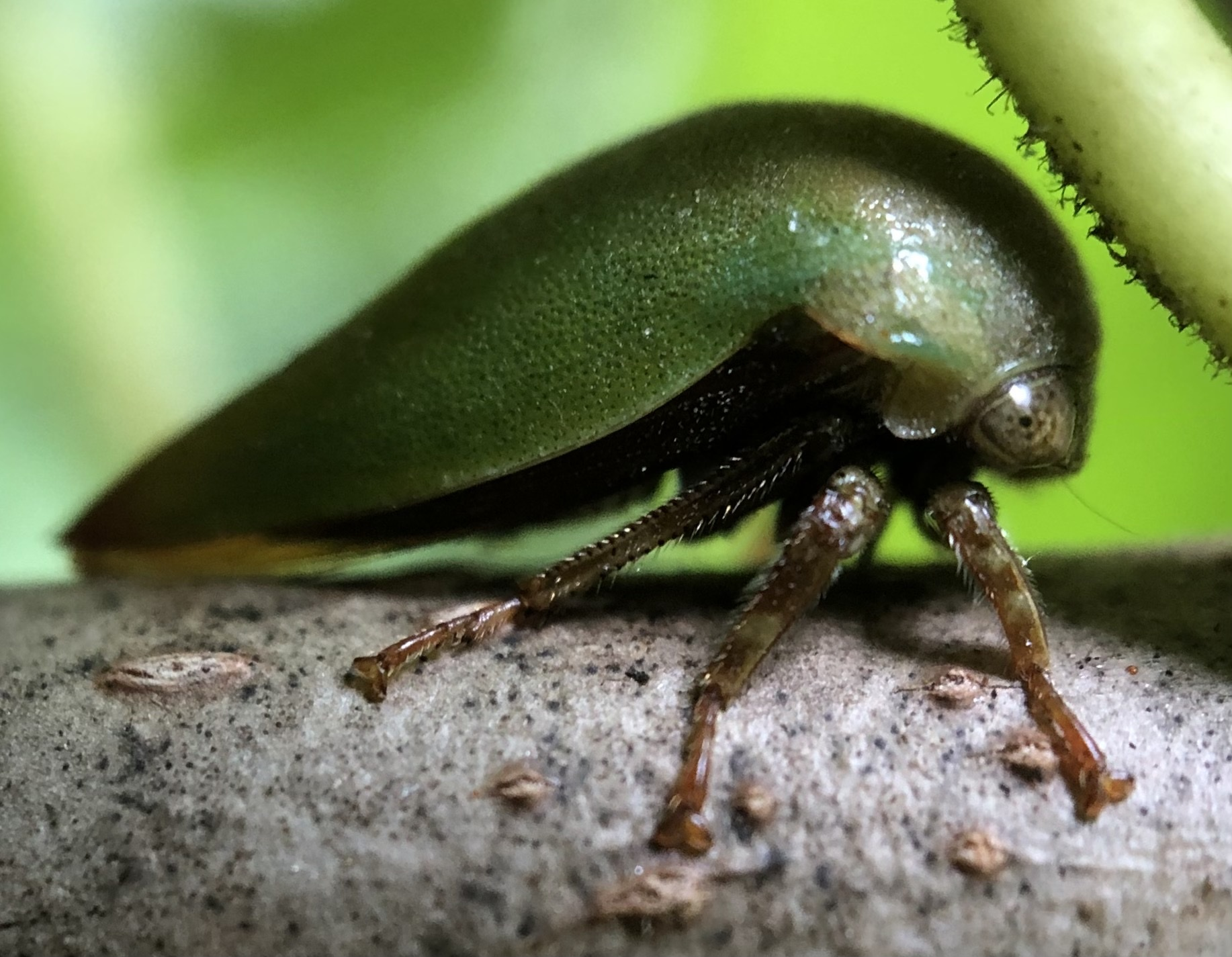
- Hebetica sylviae in Atlanta, Georgia

Scientific classification
- Kingdom: Animalia
- Phylum: Arthropoda
- Clade: Pancrustacea
- Class: Insecta
- Order: Hemiptera
- Suborder: Auchenorrhyncha
- Family: Membracidae
- Genus: Hebetica
- Species: H. sylviae

Binomial name
- Hebetica sylviae McKamey & Sullivan-Beckers, 2019
- Distribution range of Hebetica sylviae Confirmed Unconfirmed

= Hebetica sylviae =

Species of treehopper

Hebetica sylviae is a member of the treehopper family Membracidae. It is found in the eastern United States, first discovered in Murray, Kentucky, with a second sighting in Atlanta, Georgia.

It was serendipitously discovered by Laura Sullivan-Beckers in 2016, and described by Sullivan-Beckers with Stuart H. McKamey in 2019. The specific epithet honors Sullivan-Beckers's daughter Sylvie, aged two at the time, who had overwatered her flower bed, exposing members of H. sylviae that had been buried by predatory wasps. Sullivan-Beckers later contacted citizen science website iNaturalist to further document specimens across the United States.

Hebetica sylviae is the sole representative of the genus Hebetica in the Nearctic; all other members are Neotropical in distribution. In addition, it is the only member of the tribe Darnini, the raindrop treehoppers, in the Eastern United States.

== Discovery ==
Laura Sullivan-Beckers is a professor at Murray State University, with her classes focusing on zoology, ornithology, and human anatomy. Sullivan-Beckers serendipitously discovered Hebetica sylviae in 2016 while planting flowers in her backyard in Murray, Kentucky, with her then two-year-old daughter Sylvie. Her daughter had overwatered the flower bed by accident. The treehoppers, underground due to wasps storing them below ground as a food source for their larvae, had floated to the top due to the water-saturated soil.

Initially, Sullivan-Beckers was surprised by seeing the treehoppers there, as they do not live underground. She later observed wasps collecting them from trees, and assumed that the initial specimens were from the pin oak tree in her backyard. She initially noted that the treehoppers she saw appeared different, having studied the group as a PhD student. She proceeded to excavate the flower bed for additional specimens and was joined by her daughter, prompting concerns from her neighbors.

She confirmed her suspicions that the treehopper she observed was a new species with her doctoral advisor, Rex Cocroft, in addition to experts with the United States Department of Agriculture, who examined differences in wing morphology to come to the conclusion that the treehopper was a new species. Sullivan-Beckers published her discovery in 2019. The confirmation was delayed due to uncertainty as to if the treehopper was a member of the subfamily Darnini, the raindrop treehoppers, that had migrated north or that had become displaced. Sullivan-Beckers and Stuart McKamey published their initial description of H. sylviae in the Proceedings of the Entomological Society of Washington.

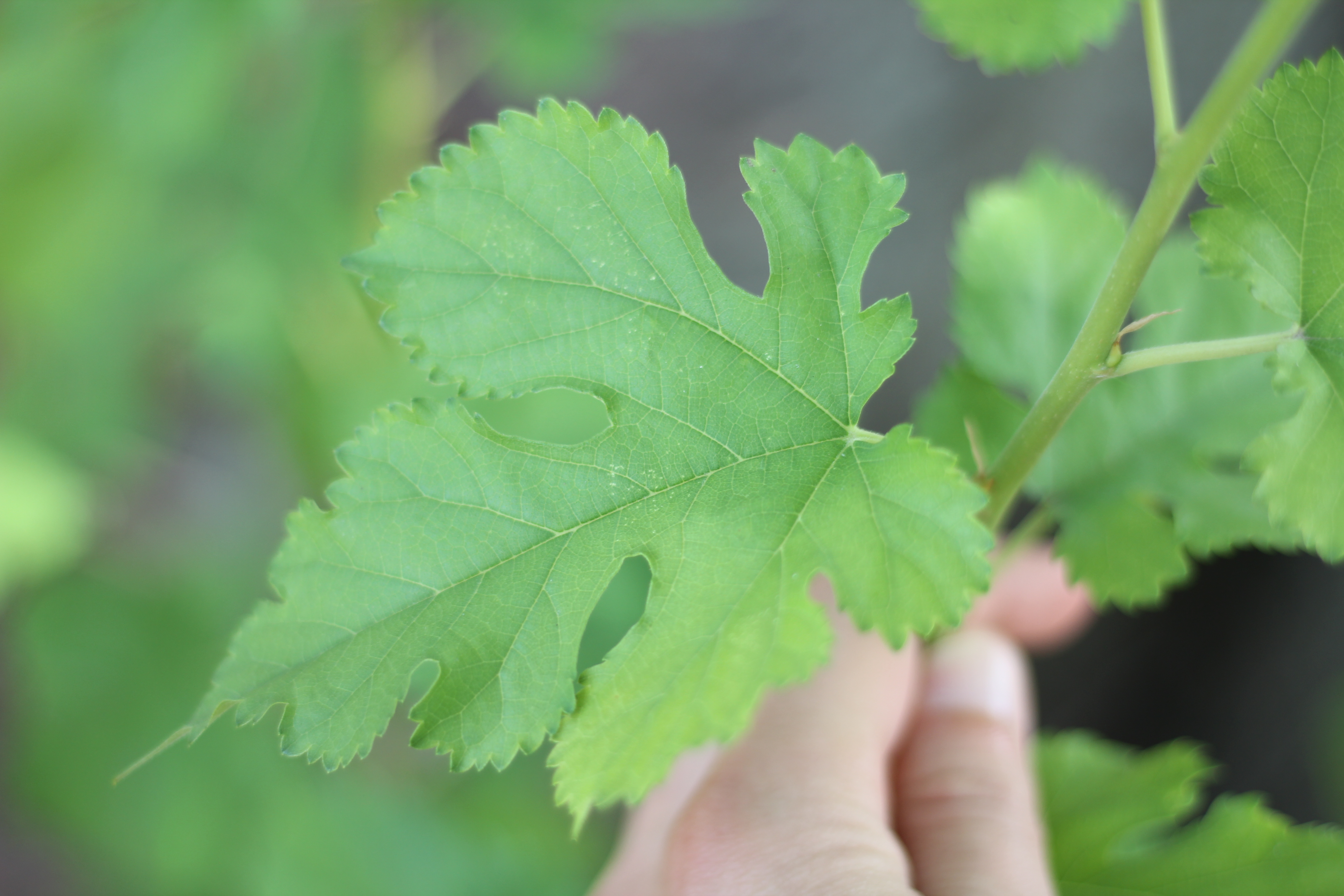
Sullivan-Beckers stated "if you see a mulberry tree, flip over the leaf and see if you can find one" as advice for individuals to find specimens

Sullivan-Beckers reached out to citizen science website, iNaturalist, to determine H. sylviae's broader distribution. The website allows naturalists to connect with each other and to review wildlife photographs. She cited the lack of resources for finding each instance of H. sylviae on mulberry plants across the United States. A chemistry professor working at Emory University in the city of Atlanta then found individuals of H. sylviae on mulberry plants. Sullivan-Beckers found around a hundred in the following period commonly near mulberry trees. She had previously only found dead individuals from predation by wasps.

== Description ==
Hebetica sylviae is unusual in that adults are green in color when alive, a trait that is uncommon among treehoppers in the United States but is more common among Neotropical treehoppers. Adults are green or pale brown, with the apex darker in color. The legs are pale brown with the exception of the femora being black. Males were between 7.5 millimetres (0.30 in) to 8.2 millimetres (0.32 in) in length, while females were 8.9 millimetres (0.35 in) to 10.0 millimetres (0.39 in) in length. According to Sullivan-Beckers and McKamey, the pronotal length is less than twice width between the humeral angles, which distinguishes it from other members of the genus Hebetica.

Members of the tribe Darnini are referred to as "raindrop treehoppers" due to their broadly rounded pronotum, making the treehopper resemble a raindrop.

== Life history ==
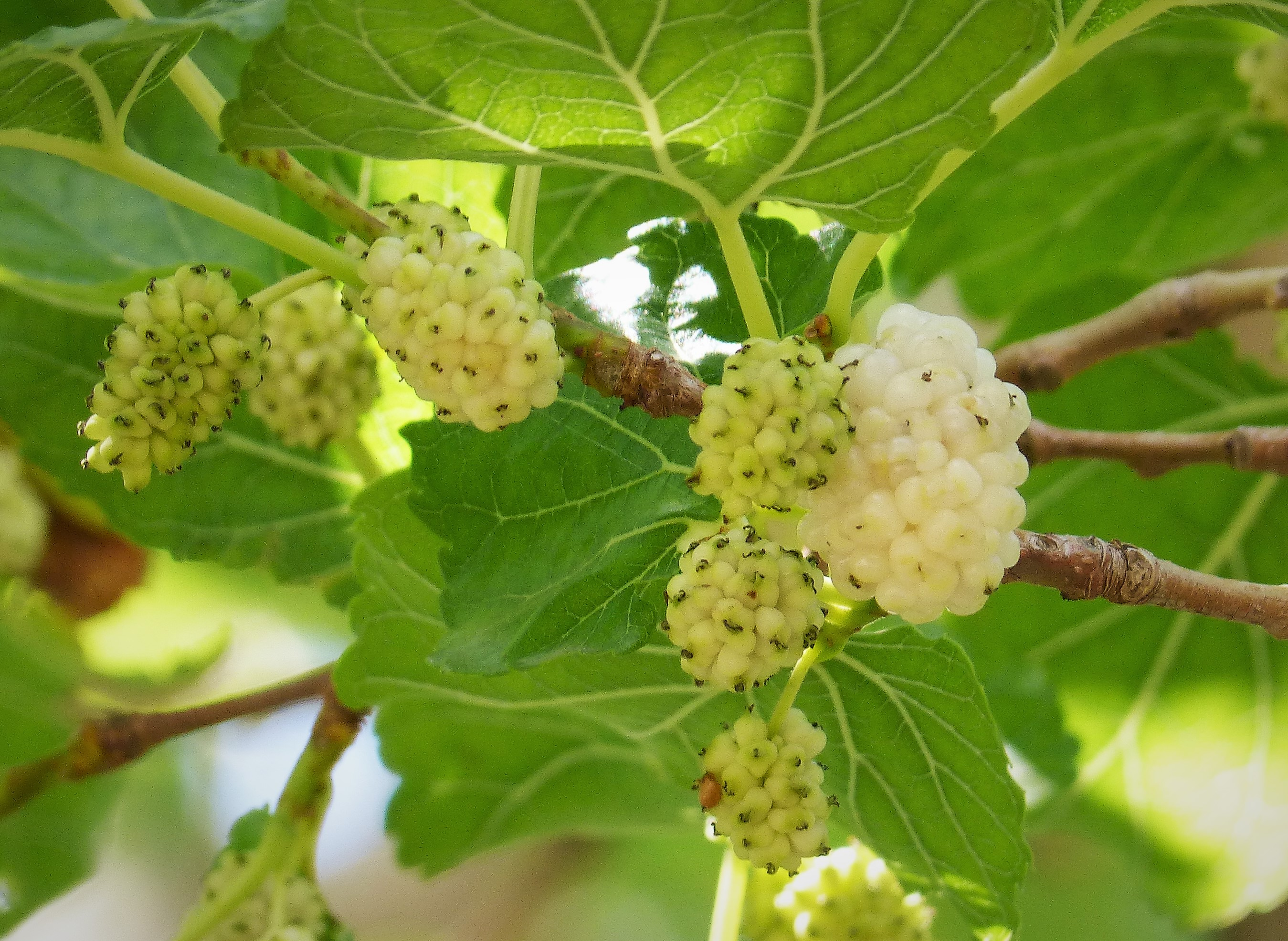
H. sylviae can be commonly found on white mulberry (Morus alba)

Sullivan-Beckers thought that Hebetica sylviae originally lived on Morus rubra, red mulberry, which is native to North America. However, the treehopper later switched to Morus alba, white mulberry, when it was introduced to the United States in the 1600s.

H. sylviae communicate through vibrational signals during courtship.

== Predators ==
Sullivan-Beckers initially discovered the treehopper being preyed upon by the sphecid wasp Hoplisoides costalis, which would sting the treehopper and bury it underground for the purposes of feeding its larvae. Members of the genus Hoplisoides exclusively consume treehoppers and leafhoppers. It was found in addition to 17 other treehopper species within the wasp burrows.

== Distribution ==
According to iNaturalist, Hebetica sylviae is known from two localities, Murray, Kentucky, and Atlanta, Georgia. It is thought that the treehopper shares a similar distribution to white mulberry on North America, possibly extending as far as Canada and Mexico.

Stuart H. McKamey, an entomologist for the United States Department of Agriculture who had contacted Sullivan-Beckers to confirm her discovery noted that the closest relatives of Hebetica sylviae are found exclusively within South America, making H. sylviae the sole Nearctic representative of the almost-exclusively Neotropical genus Hebetica. McKamey stated that there was "nothing similar" within 1,000 miles (1,600 km) of the discovery site, and that it was uncertain that H. sylviae had evolved there. There exists a possibility that H. sylviae was an exotic species introduced to the United States. This separation from other members of its genus meant that H. sylviae had a disjunct distribution. The initial publication noted that it was the first record of the tribe Darnini in the Eastern United States, with the sole exception of a doubtful sighting of Darnis lateralis nymph in the Mojave Desert. The remainder of the tribe is of the genus Stictopelta, with the most similar species to H. sylviae being an undescribed member of the genus Hebetica found in Mexico.

== Etymology ==
Sullivan-Beckers named Hebetica sylviae after her daughter Sylvie, having specifically requested to name the treehopper after her daughter due to her crucial role in its discovery. Sullivan-Beckers stated: "[She] was at the heart of the discovery, and it's not every day a mother gets the chance to name a species after her child."

== See also ==
- Semachrysa jade, a species of lacewing serendipitously discovered when its discoverer posted a photograph of it on Flickr
