= Zeta Phi =

American college fraternity (1870–1890)

- ΖΦ
- Founded: November 7, 1870; 155 years ago University of Missouri
- Type: Social
- Affiliation: Independent
- Status: Merged
- Merge date: 1890
- Successor: Beta Theta Pi
- Scope: Regional
- Colors: White
- Chapters: 4
- Members: 200+ lifetime
- Headquarters: Columbia, Missouri; United States

The Zeta Phi Society (ΖΦ) was a regional American fraternity founded in 1870 at the University of Missouri in Columbia, Missouri. It was the first independent fraternity to be established west of the Mississippi River. It chartered four chapters before its last active chapter joined Beta Theta Pi in 1890.

== History ==
=== Formation ===
Oren Root II formed Zeta Phi Society at the University of Missouri in Columbia, Missouri. Root had been chair of the Department of English Language and Literature at the University of Missouri since 1866. He convened Zeta Phi's first meeting with eight students in the university's Union Literary Hall (now known as Switzler Hall) on November 7, 1870.

Zeta Phi was originally planned as a literary society. Its founding members were Nelson Washington Allen, Scott Hayes, Frank M. Houts, Jacob Linn Ladd, Lycurgus A. Marvin, Evans Perry McDonald, George Bingham Rollins, and Robert F. Walker. Initially, Root was not a member of the society but was inducted at a later date.

Zeta Phi was modeled after Sigma Phi, Root's college fraternity. Root may have envisioned Zeta Phi as a future chapter of Sigma Phi. At the second meeting on December 15, 1870, Zeta Phi's founders instead decided to become the mother chapter of a Western United States fraternity. They also adopted a fraternity color and a badge, with the latter being similar to that of Sigma Phi.

Zeta Phi was the first independent fraternity to be established west of the Mississippi River. Although it was originally intended to be a literary society, Zeta Phi's ideals were similar to of modern Greek-letter fraternities. The first minutes of the society read as follows: "There having been some previous understanding with a few young men of the University that a meeting be held for the organization of a secret society, the object of which was to be a social and intellectual culture, as well as close intimacy through life..."

Originally, the Alpha chapter of Zeta Phi met in a third-floor room of Academic Hall. Later, the society met in Switzler Hall before renting a second-floor room in a hall in downtown Columbia. Activities including annual addresses by guest speakers. Edwin William Stephens, editor of the Columbia Herald, delivered an oration for the Sigma chapter in June 1872.

=== Expansion ===
On November 18, 1871, the Sigma chapter of Zeta Phi was chartered at William Jewell College in Liberty, Missouri. This was followed by and on December 9, 1872, the Omicron of Zeta Phi was chartered at Washington University in St. Louis on December 9, 1872. A fourth chapter was chartered in the University of Kansas in 1873; however, based on a lack of mentions in the society's minutes, it may never have been installed. Omicron went inactive after 1874 due to anti-fraternity sentiment of the university's faculty.

Alpha chapter built goodwill by initiating more faculty members and distinguished community members. The chapter began to place more emphasis on social activities, including serenading young ladies. Several women were initiated into the chapter and were given a small pin. However, Alpha chapter had reduced its activities and had only eight active members in 1882. Baird's Manual of American College Fraternities noted that Alpha was "weak and running sub rosa" in 1883. It rebounded with twenty members in 1884.

=== Merger ===
Zeta Phi received and declined several invitations to unite with national fraternities, including Alpha Tau Omega, Sigma Nu, Kappa Alpha (Southern), and Phi Kappa Psi. Eighteen active Alpha chapter members sent a petition to the Beta Theta Pi fraternity on June 4, 1885, requesting admission. Members of Alpha had developed a relationship with the Alpha Delta chapter of Beta Theta Pi at Westminster College n Fulton, Missouri. However, their petition was withdraw, possibly because dissent from alumni and the Sigma chapter. Zeta Phi notified the Westminster Betas. "We are not anxious to enter" after a meeting on January 6, 1886.

The Sigma chapter withdrew from Zeta Phi to become a chapter of Phi Gamma Delta in 1886. As a result, the Alpha chapter reconsidered a merger. On March 8, 1890, Alpha voted to join Beta Theta Pi, provided its chapter would retain the Zeta Phi name and all of the chapter's active members and alumni would be granted membership. Beta Theta Pi approved their petition at its summer 1890 convention.

The changeover ceremony from Zeta Phi Society to Zeta Phi chapter of Beta Theta Pi took place at Stone Hall, initiating all Alpha's active members and alumni members of Beta Theta Pi. With this ceremony, Zeta Phi became officially dormant in 1890 when Alpha joined Beta Theta Pi. Alpha had initiated 198 members before its merger.

== Symbols ==
Zeta Beta's badge closely resembled that of Sigma Phi; it was a monogram of the Greek letter Ζ, superimposed over the letter Φ. Members wore a badge of mourning when an alumnus died. The fraternity's color was white.

The fraternity's members was assigned secret chapters designations, representing of prominent literary or scientific figures. Some examples were documents in early minutes, including Julius Caesar, Nicolaus Copernicus, and Isaac Newton.

== Chapters ==
The following are the known chapters of Zeta Phi were as follows.

Chapter	Charter date and range	Institution	Location	Status	Ref.
Alpha	November 7, 1870 – 1890	University of Missouri	Columbia, Missouri	Merged (ΒΘΠ)	(Note: Merged and became the Zeta Phi chapter of Beta Theta Pi.)
Sigma	November 18, 1871 – 1886	William Jewell College	Liberty, Missouri	Withdrew (ΦΓΔ)	(Note: Withdrew from the fraternity and became the Zeta Phi chapter of Phi Gamma Delta.)
Omicron	December 9, 1872 – 1874	Washington University in St. Louis	St. Louis, Missouri	Inactive	(Note: The name of this chapter is reported by the Almanac as Delta. Alpha chapter's history notes it was Omicron. The chapter went inactive due to an anti-fraternity sentiment on campus.)
	1873–c. 1873	University of Kansas	Lawrence, Kansas	Inactive	(Note: This short-lived fourth chapter was chartered, but Zeta Phi records do not show it was ever installed.)

== Notable members ==
Name	Chapter and year	Notability	Ref.
William Hugh Brinker	Alpha	Justice on the New Mexico Supreme Court	
William S. Cowherd	Alpha, 1881	Mayor of Kansas City, Missouri and United States House of Representatives	
William B. Cravens	Alpha, 1893	United States House of Representatives	
Thomas T. Crittenden Jr.	Alpha, 1882	Mayor of Kansas City, Missouri	
Enoch Crowder	Alpha, 1886	United States Army general during World War I	
Andrew W. McAlester	Alpha, 18xx ?	Chair of Surgery and Obstetrics and Dean of the Faculty of Medicine at the University of Missouri	
Thomas Franklin Fairfax Millard	Alpha, 1884	Journalist, newspaper editor, founder of the China Weekly Review, and a war correspondent for the New York Herald	
John Hardin Nickel	Alpha, 1878	Missouri House of Representatives	
Oren Root II	Alpha, 1870	Presbyterian minister and professor at Hamilton College and the University of Missouri	
Thomas L. Rubey	Alpha, 1885	United States House of Representatives, president of the Missouri Senate, and Lieutenant Governor of Missouri	
Edwin William Stephens	Alpha, 1870	Publisher, journalist, and founder of the E.W. Stephens Publishing Company	
Robert F. Walker	Alpha, 1870	Missouri Attorney General and Supreme Court of Missouri justice	
Charles Yeater	Alpha, 1880	Governor-General of the Philippines, Philippine Secretary of Public Instruction, and Missouri Senate	

== See also ==
- List of social fraternities
