= C. Fred Ackerman =

American filmmaker

Aguinaldo's navy

25th Infantry in the Philippines

Carl Frederick Ackerman (17 June 1873 – 4 April 1938), also known as Raymond Ackerman, was an American journalist and early filmmaker.

Ackerman was from Syracuse, New York, and was the sports editor for the Syracuse Standard. His work included actuality films including from the Philippines during wartime in 1900 and from China during the Boxer Rebellion era. He worked for American Mutoscope and Biograph Company.

In the Philippines, Ackerman filmed Filipino Cockfight, the Battle of Mt. Arayat (Mount Ariat), and other scenes. He was sent to cover the U.S. fight against an independence movement.

In 1901, Ackerman toured the United States with journalist Thomas Franklin Fairfax Millard making presentations about the Boxer Rebellion and China.

== See also ==
- W. K. L. Dickson
