= Lewis Diuguid =

Kansas City journalist and author

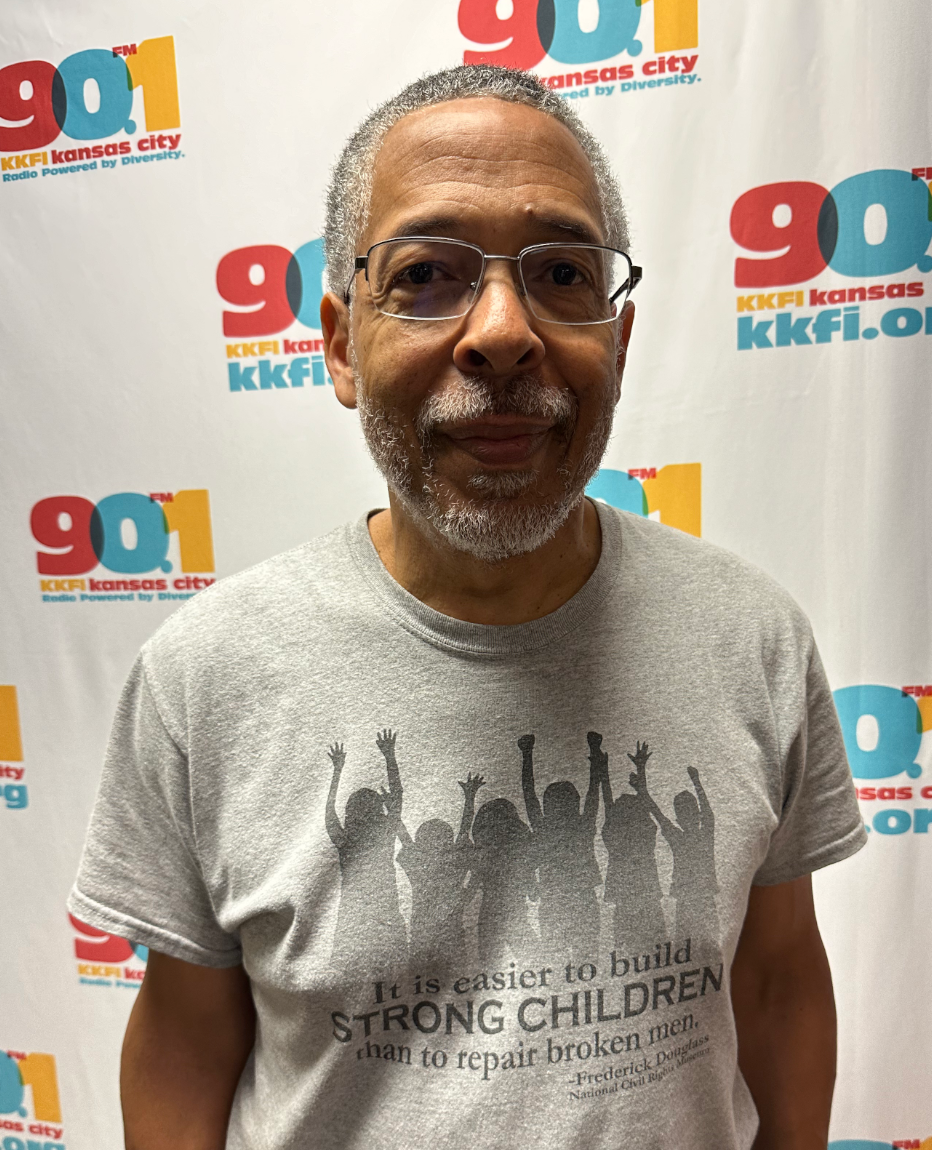

Lewis Walter Diuguid is an American journalist and author in Kansas City. After almost 40 years at the Kansas City Star, he won the 2017 "Louis M. Lyons Award for Conscience and Integrity in Journalism" from the Nieman Foundation for Journalism at Harvard University.

He is also author or co-author of four books.

== Early life ==
Diuguid was raised in St. Louis, son of Lincoln (1917–2015) and Nancy R. Diuguid. Lewis' father earned a PhD in organic chemistry from Cornell. However, when Lincoln wanted to found "Du-Good Chemical" company in St. Louis in 1947, the financial markets were not available to African Americans. Instead, he raised money from relatives to buy the land for his company. That company manufactured cosmetics and other chemicals, while also providing jobs for young black people from the community and helping them into college and careers. Many neighboring black-owned businesses followed Du-Good Chemical in that regard. Lewis said that his father had "always dreamed of running his own business on a city block full of black business owners"; he turned those dreams into reality.

Lewis Diuguid is actually Lewis Walter Diuguid, 2nd, named after his paternal grandfather, not his father.

== Adult life ==
In 1977 Diuguid earned a Bachelor of Journalism (BJ) from the Missouri School of Journalism, part of the University of Missouri at Columbia. With his BJ, he started reporting for the Kansas City Times, which at that time was the morning edition of the Kansas City Star. When the Star stopped publishing the Times in 1990, they kept Diuguid. In 2000, he received the Missouri Honor Medal for Distinguished Service in Journalism from the Missouri School of Journalism.

Diuguid later said that when he first came to Kansas City, he planned to stay about two years. Not quite half a century later, he was still there. A 2019 bio said that he had lived in the Indian Mound neighborhood of Northeast Kansas City since 2009, raising two daughters there.

In 2011, Diuguid received the Local Journalist Award from the American Journalism Historians Association. The citation mentioned his accomplishments as a columnist and member of the editorial board of the Star and as a co-chair of the Star's diversity initiatives. The award citation also said he had funded scholarships to help students of color pursue careers in journalism. He resigned from the Star after almost 40 years with them.

For Diuguid's 2004 book on A Teacher’s Cry: Expose the Truth About Education Today, he conducted numerous interviews with students of the Class of 1999 at Washington High School in Kansas City, Kansas, from their freshman year until graduation. Goodreads says, "The manuscript insists that community involvement in the schools and in the classrooms is how education can best be improved."

In 2015 he won the Angelo B. Henderson Community Service Award from the National Association of Black Journalists for his "positive effect on the community beyond the normal journalism realm."

In 2016 he won the Louis M. Lyons Award for Conscience and Integrity in Journalism from the Nieman Foundation for Journalism at Harvard, "In recognition of his commitment to excellence in journalism as well as his work as a newsroom leader and role model for young journalists". The announcement of the award mentioned "his nearly 40-year career as a reporter, editor, columnist and editorial board member at The Kansas City Star". It also said he had "distinguished himself as a relentless advocate for newsroom diversity." And it said, "He tirelessly used his voice to draw attention to societal inequities, write about civil rights and highlight systemic injustices." It also mentioned the two books he had published by that time, Diiuguid (2004, 2007).

His 2017 biography of his father was well received. KCUR, the NPR station in Kansas City, carried an interview with him about that book. They said that Lewis "takes us back to" the city block in St. Louis where he grew up. Lewis was also interviewed about that book by Harold Smith for KC Studio, an arts magazine in Kansas City. In addition, Lewis received the 2017 Philip C. Chinn Book Award from the National Association for Multicultural Education (NAME) in recognition of the value of that book. The St. Louis American, a leading African American weekly newspaper in St. Louis, Missouri, reported that the Saint Louis Science Center celebrated Martin Luther King Jr. Day in 2018 with Lewis discussing that book.

Diuguid was an invited speaker at the eighth annual Greater Kansas City Peacebuilding Conference in 2020 discussing “Disinformation, Civil Rights Protests, and Social Justice.”

He has also served as the chair of the Political Action Committee for NAME. And he partnered for many years with Bette Tate-Beaver, who served as executive director of NAME from 2009 until her death 29 August 2021. That partnership helped raise awareness of "sins of both commission and omission [that] disenfranchised, ignored and scorned generations of Black Kansas Citians”, leading to an official apology in 2020 by the Kansas City Star of their contributions to those "sins".

In 2024 he completed a book on Exploring Cuba : erasing fears through multicultural education with Tate-Beaver, who had died over two years earlier. The book describes cultural and professional exchanges with trips to Cuba organized by NAME between 2015 and 2019 with additional comments on the impact of the coronavirus pandemic on US-Cuba relations.
