= George Woodward Warder =

American poet and philosopher (1848–1907)

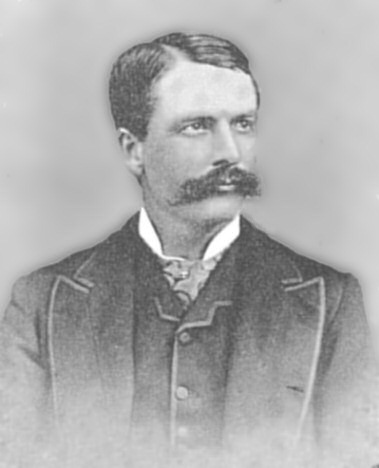
- George Woodward Warder in about 1880
- Born: May 20, 1848; Richmond, Missouri
- Died: February 8, 1907 (aged 58)
- Occupations: Lawyer, poet, author, philosopher

George Woodward Warder (May 20, 1848 – February 8, 1907) was a poet, philosopher and author from Missouri, USA.

== Life ==
Warder was a student at the University of Missouri. At the age of eighteen, he practiced law. He later became a successful lawyer with an interest in banking. In 1878, Warder moved to Kansas City, Missouri, continuing his law practice and other financial enterprises. He invested in real estate and construction.

== Books ==
Warder was also a poet and philosopher. Warder wrote many books, such as Poetic Fragments, or, College Poems (1873), Eden Dell, or, Love's Wanderings and other Poems (1878), Utopian Dreams and Lotus Leaves (1885) and After Which All Things, or, Footprints and Shadows (1895).

Warder also developed his own cosmology theory. Warder authored The New Cosmogony (1898), Invisible Light, or Electric Theory of Creation (1899), The Cities of the Sun (1901), The Stairway to the Stars (1902), The Universe a Vast Electric Organism (1903). Warder believed that the universe was an electrical creation and that electricity plays a more critical role in the universe than is generally accepted.
