= George Bates (English footballer) =

English footballer

Personal information
- Full name: George Reginald Bates
- Date of birth: 21 November 1923
- Place of birth: Sheffield, England
- Date of death: January 1995 (aged 71)
- Place of death: Sheffield, England
- Position: Winger

Senior career*
Years	Team	Apps	(Gls)
–	Shardlows		
1945–1946	Sheffield Wednesday	0	(0)
1946–1947	Darlington	3	(0)
1947	Lincoln City	0	(0)
1947	Goole Town		
1947–1950	Gainsborough Trinity		
1950–19??	Boston United	0	(0)
- * Club domestic league appearances and goals

George Reginald Bates (21 November 1923 – January 1995) was an English footballer who played on the wing for Darlington in the Football League. He was on the books of Sheffield Wednesday and Lincoln City without representing either in the League, and played non-league football for Gainsborough Trinity.

== Life and career ==
Bates was born in Sheffield in 1923, the son of Reginald and Alice Bates. At the time of the 1939 Register, the family were living in Cammell Road, Sheffield; Bates was working as an assistant in a grocer's shop and his father was a locomotive driver.

Bates played football for the works team of Sheffield-based crankshaft manufacturer Ambrose Shardlow before joining Sheffield Wednesday in March 1945. He made nine appearances and scored once in the wartime leagues during what remained of the 1944–45 season, but played no first-team football in 1945–46. He then signed for Darlington, and appeared in three of the first four Third Division North matches of the 1946–47 Football League season.

After trials with another Third Division North club, Lincoln City, during which he appeared in the Midland League for their reserve team – according to the Lincolnshire Echo, he "accomplished little, apart from a left foot drive that all but produced an early goal" and with Yorkshire League club Goole Town, Bates signed for Gainsborough Trinity, with whom he spent the next three seasons. He played regularly for their Midland League side for the first two years, but towards the end of the third he was more often with the reserve team in the Yorkshire League. In 1950, he signed for Boston United, but never played first-team football for them.

Bates died in Sheffield in 1995 at the age of 71.
