= Jason Klumb =

American politician

Jason O. Klumb
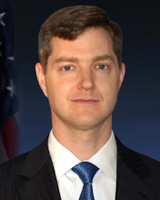
- Regional Administrator; The Heartland Region

U.S. General Services Administration
- In office February 24, 2010 – December 16, 2016
- Preceded by: Bradley M. Scott

Member of the Missouri House of Representatives from Missouri's 125th District
- In office 1993–1997

Personal details
- Born: August 24, 1968 (age 58)
- Party: Democratic Party
- Spouse: Begonya Klumb
- Children: 2
- Education: William Jewell College (B.A.); University of Missouri (J.D.); London School of Economics (M.S.); Air Force University (Air War College); University of Missouri-Kansas City (Ph.D. - expected 2021)
- Occupation: Lawyer

Jason O. Klumb (born August 24, 1968) was the Regional Administrator of The Heartland Region of the U.S. General Services Administration. Klumb was appointed to the lead GSA's Heartland Region by President Barack Obama in February 2010. He is currently an attorney/advisor in private practice, a PhD graduate, and a Colonel in the Missouri National Guard.

== Early life and education ==
Jason Klumb grew up in Butler, Missouri. After high school, he attended William Jewell College in Liberty, Missouri. He spent his sophomore year in college studying abroad at Seinan Gakuin University in Japan. During his junior year, he interned with the office of U.S. Congressman Ike Skelton. Klumb earned his Juris Doctor from the University of Missouri School of Law in 1996 while he was a Missouri State Representative. Klumb also has a Master of Science degree from the London School of Economics. He is pursuing a PhD through the Bloch School of Management at the University of Missouri - Kansas City, in the area of Public Administration. His studies have focused on public private partnerships as applied to transportation, infrastructure, and sustainability projects.

== Missouri House of Representatives ==
Jason Klumb temporarily left law school in 1992 to work on Mel Carnahan’s campaign for governor in 1992. After a short time with the Carnahan campaign, Klumb left to launch his own campaign for the Missouri House of Representatives. Klumb was elected to the Missouri House of Representatives in 1992. At age 24, he was one of the youngest members ever to serve in the Missouri legislature. Klumb represented Bates, Cass, and Vernon Counties as the 125th District Representative to the Missouri House of Representatives. Klumb was elected to a second term in 1994. As a State Representative, Klumb was Chairman of the Administrative Rules Committee. He was also a member of the Ways and Means, Commerce, and Agri-Business Committees. Klumb returned to finish law school at the University of Missouri while serving in the Missouri House.

== Life after elected office ==
Jason Klumb moved with his wife Begonya to Connecticut, where they lived while she completed her MBA at Yale University. While in Connecticut, Jason Klumb served as counsel for a Connecticut Senate leader. Following two years in Connecticut, the Klumbs returned to Missouri, where Jason opened a private law practice and joined the Judge Advocate General Corps of the Army National Guard. He was deployed to Kosovo for a year as part of Operation Enduring Freedom. He is a Colonel in the Missouri Air National Guard, serving as the State Staff Judge Advocate at Missouri Guard Headquarters, Ike Skelton Training Site.

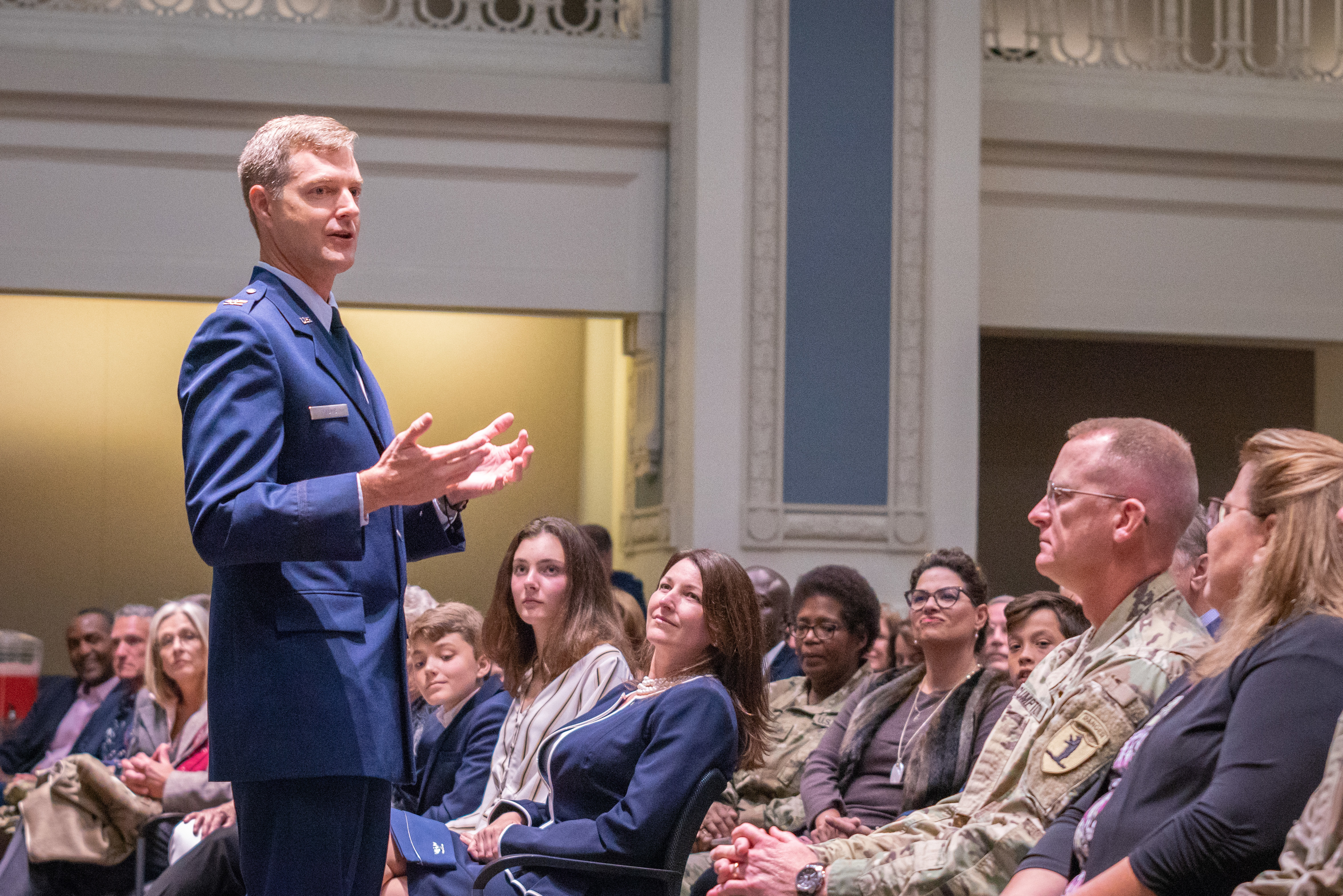
Promotion ceremony for Colonel Jason Klumb

Following a failed campaign for the office of Missouri State Treasurer in 2004, Klumb ran for the 10th District Missouri State Senate seat vacated by Charles Wheeler in 2006. Klumb lost the Democratic primary in August 2006 to Jolie Justus. In 2017, he was appointed to serve on the Jackson County Board of Equalization by County Executive Frank White.

== Military service ==
Klumb served in the Army National Guard, rising to the rank of Major. He is currently a Colonel in the Air National Guard, assigned to Missouri State Headquarters at Ike Skelton Training Site as the State Staff Judge Advocate.

Awards and medals include

- Armed Forces Reserve Medal
- Army Overseas Service Ribbon
- Global War on Terrorism Service Medal
- Meritorious Service Medal
- National Defense Service Medal

== General Services Administration ==
Jason Klumb was appointed by President Obama to the position of Regional Administrator of The Heartland Region for the U.S. General Services Administration on February 24, 2010. As the regional head of GSA, Klumb is responsible for the agency's operations in Missouri, Kansas, Iowa, and Nebraska; including 400 buildings, a budget of $175 million, and 1000 employees. Klumb spent significant time in the media spotlight as a result investigations into environmental issues and health concerns at the Bannister Federal Complex that surfaced shortly before his appointment to the position at GSA.

Projects of note during Klumb's tenure include: The $863 million National Nuclear Security Administration campus in Kansas City, the National Personnel Records Center in St. Louis, the Christopher S. Bond Courthouse, and the Cedar Rapids Courthouse. Klumb was elected as chairman of the Federal Executive Board, and Klumb was named one of the regions most influential leaders.

Preceded by Bradley M. Scott	Regional Administrator of The Heartland Region; U.S. General Services Administration; 2010 –	Succeeded by Incumbent
