= Lori Borgman =

American writer

Lori Borgman (born in Lincoln, Nebraska) is a nationally distributed columnist, author of four books and speaker addressing family matters from a humorous point of view. A graduate of Center High School in Kansas City, Missouri, she also attended the University of Missouri School of Journalism.

Borgman landed a columnist spot with The Indianapolis Star in 1991. Several years later McClatchy-Tribune News Service began distributing her column throughout the United States and Canada. She is now distributed by Tribune Publishing to more than 400 newspapers and media outlets throughout the United States and Canada.

One of her most popular essays, "The Death of Common Sense", written in 1998, continues to be circulated around the world.

In 2019, Borgman presented her latest book, What Happens at Grandma’s Stays at Grandma’s to a sold-out audience.
