= Laura Sullivan-Beckers =

Evolutionary biologist

Laura Sullivan-Beckers is an associate professor of evolutionary biology at Murray State University. She is credited with the discovery of Hebetica sylviae, a species of treehopper, named for her daughter Sylvie Beckers.

== Early life and education ==
Originally studying human forms of communication and earning a bachelor's in Spanish from the University of Tulsa, Sullivan-Beckers became fascinated with the ways birds communicate, and went back to school almost immediately, graduating from Northeastern State University in 2002 with a Bachelor of Science in Biology. She then pursued a Ph.D. in Biological Sciences from the University of Missouri, publishing her doctoral research and graduating in 2008.

== Discovery of Hebetica sylviae ==
In the summer of 2016, Sullivan-Beckers asked her 2-year-old daughter Sylvie to water some seeds she had just planted in the backyard of their home. Sylvie overwatered the soil, and small, bright green treehoppers began to float to the top. Sullivan-Beckers noted the oddity of tree-dwelling insects to be dead and buried in the ground. She soon began collecting samples from her backyard, including 72 of the new species, and sent them to Dr. Stuart McKamey, a collaborative researcher at the USDA. “As soon as it was confirmed as a new species, I knew I wanted it named after Sylvie. She was at the heart of the discovery, and it’s not every day a mother gets the chance to name a species after her child,” she said. The species is a variety of treehopper from the Darninae tribe. Sullivan-Beckers co-authored an illustrated description of the insects with Stuart H. McKamey which was presented at Entomological Society of Washington.

== Other research ==
Sullivan-Beckers continues to study wolf spider communication habits at Murray State, and teaches undergraduate courses in human anatomy, zoology, and ornithology. Additionally, Sullivan-Beckers has published a number of papers and book chapters on evolution and sexual selection in publications such as Evolution, Biometrics, Current Zoology, and Animal Behaviour.

== Works ==
- "Mate Choice and Learning". Encyclopedia of Animal Behaviour. Elsevier. 2010
- "Female Preference Functions Provide a Window Into Cognition, the Evolution of Communication, and Speciation in Plant-Feeding Insects". The Oxford Handbook of Comparative Evolutionary Psychology. OUP. 2012
- Sullivan-Beckers, Laura; Hebets, Eileen (May 1, 2014). "Tactical adjustment of signaling leads to increased mating success and survival". Eileen Hebets Publications.
