= Huda Salih Mahdi Ammash =

Iraqi microbiologist

Member of the Revolutionary Command Council
- In office 18 May 2001 – 9 April 2003

Member of the Regional Command of the Iraqi Regional Branch
- In office 18 May 2001 – 9 April 2003

Personal details
- Born: 29 October 1953 (age 72) Baghdad, Kingdom of Iraq
- Citizenship: Iraq
- Education: University of Baghdad (Bachelor's); Texas Woman's University (Master's); University of Missouri (PhD)

Huda Salih Mahdi Ammash (Arabic: هدى صالح مهدي عماش) (born 29 October 1953) is an Iraqi scientist and academic. Ammash was often referred to as "Mrs. Anthrax" or "Chemical Sally" due to her alleged association with an Iraqi biological weapons program.

Ammash was number 53 on the Pentagon's list of the 55 most wanted, the "five of hearts", in the U.S. deck of most-wanted Iraqi playing cards, and the only woman to be featured. She surrendered to coalition forces in May 2003 but was released in December 2005 without being charged.

== Life ==
She received her undergraduate degree from the University of Baghdad, followed by a master's in microbiology from Texas Woman's University in Denton, Texas. She spent four years at the University of Missouri pursuing a doctorate in microbiology, which she received in December 1983. Her thesis focused on the effects of radiation, paraquat and the chemotherapy drug Adriamycin, on bacteria and mammals.

She was appointed to the Revolutionary Command Council in May 2001. In one of several videos that Saddam released during the war, Ammash was the only woman among about a half-dozen men seated around a table. The videos were broadcast on Iraqi TV as invading forces drew closer to Baghdad: it is not known when the meeting took place or what the significance was of her appearance on camera. She served as president of Iraq's microbiology society and as dean at the University of Baghdad. U.S. officials said she was trained by Nassir al-Hindawi, described by United Nations inspectors as the "father of Iraq's biological weapons program". She conducted research into illnesses that may have been caused by depleted uranium from shells used in the 1991 Gulf War, and had published several papers on the health effects of the war and the subsequent sanctions.

=== Capture ===
Ammash surrendered to coalition forces on 9 May 2003 and was one of two Iraqi women known to be in U.S. custody as of April 2005. The other was the British-educated Rihab Taha, who led Iraq's biological weapons program until 1995.

In August 2005, the American Association for the Advancement of Science called for Ammash to be either sent to trial or released:

Although she has neither been charged with a crime nor brought to trial, the Iraqi scientist remains in prison today, accused by the US Government of being the head of Saddam Hussein's biowarfare programme - a programme of which no evidence has been found.

— AAAS

According to Times Higher Education, "The organisation [AAAS] has not issued the statement lightly. Senior figures including Alan Leshner, chief executive officer of the AAAS, were involved in drawing it up."

Both women were released in December 2005 after they were among those an American-Iraqi board process found were no longer a security threat and would have no charges filed against them. Ammash was also said to be suffering from breast cancer.

== Family ==
Ammash's father, Salih Mahdi Ammash, was a high-level Baath Party member in Iraq, who became defense minister in 1963, deputy prime minister in 1968, and an ambassador in 1977.
