= Śmiłowski =

Śmiłowski (feminine: Śmiłowska; plural: Śmiłowscy) is a Polish surname. Notable people with the surname include:

- Karol Grycz-Śmiłowski (1885–1959), Polish Lutheran priest
- Paweł Śmiłowski (born 1998), Polish badminton player
