= George Bates (wheelchair basketball) =

British wheelchair basketball player

Personal information
- Born: 18 June 1994 (age 32) Leicester, England
- Number: 94 | 8

Career history
- 2008-2014: Leicester Cobras
- 2014-2017: Porto Torres
- 2017-2018: Sheffield Steelers
- 2018-2021: Mideba Extremadura
- 2021-Present: Sheffield Steelers

George Bates (born 18 June 1994) is a British professional wheelchair basketball player. He has played professionally since 2014, playing in England, Italy, and Spain. Bates has also represented Great Britain at under 23 and senior level. He is the Head Coach of the Loughborough Lightning Wheelchair Basketball Team.

== Early life ==
Bates was born in Leicester, England on 18 June 1994 and is the eldest of 3 brothers. Having loved sport from a young age he played football, cricket, and golf. In 2006 he suffered an injury playing football for his local team Groby Juniors. As a result of this injury Bates then developed complex regional pain syndrome in his left leg, leaving him unable to walk unaided. He was then introduced to wheelchair basketball in 2008 after seeing a poster for a taster session.

== Wheelchair basketball ==
Bates started playing wheelchair basketball at his local team Leicester Cobras in 2006. By 2012 he was training with the Great Britain under 23 team. In 2013 Bates played in the Under 23 world championships, where the British team finished 4th after losing to Australia in the bronze medal game. The following year the Great Britain under 22 team would go on to win the European championships in Zaragoza, Spain. After this success he then signed professionally for Porto Torres based in Sardinia, Italy. In his last year he broke in to the senior Great Britain team and achieved a silver medal in the 2017 European Championships. A year later Bates was part of the Great Britain team win the 2018 Wheelchair Basketball World Championship in Hamburg, Germany. He finished the final as the joint top scorer. After the success he then moved to Badajoz to play for Mideba Extremadura in the Spanish league, during his time there he won the accolade of the top scorer in the league in his first season. In 2019 he had more success with the GB team as they won the European Championships In Wałbrzych, Poland this meant the team also qualified for the 2020 Paralympic Games in Tokyo, Japan.

=== Classification and eligibility ===
Bates is classified as a 4.5 point player. In 2020, due to rule changes in the International Paralympic Committee classification code, Complex regional pain syndrome was deemed to be a non eligible impairment. Subsequent media reports claimed he was considering to have his leg amputated in order to stay eligible to compete in the Paralympic Games
