= George E. Bates (professor) =

American academic

George Eugene Bates
- Born: February 23, 1902; Kansas City, Missouri, U.S.
- Died: September 25, 1992 (aged 90); Camden, Maine, U.S.
- Education: University of Missouri; Harvard Business School
- Occupation: Academic
- Spouse(s): Dorothea Bates (married 1931–1943); Katharine Louise MacMillan (married 1949–1992)
- Children: 2 sons

George E. Bates (1902–1992) was an American academic. He was a professor of investment management at the Harvard Business School and the editor of the Harvard Business Review.

== Early life ==
George E. Bates was born in Kansas City, Missouri, on February 23, 1902, the son of W. Scott and Emyle Louise (Carlat) Bates. He graduated from Westport High School in Kansas City in 1919. While in high school he attended Culver Summer Naval School (Culver, Indiana), in 1917 and 1918. He earned both an A.B. (1923) and an A.M. (1924) from the University of Missouri and then a master in business administration (M.B.A.) from the Harvard Business School in 1925.

== Career ==
Bates joined his father's lumber yard business, W. S. Bates & Son, in 1923 and remained a partner until 1940. The yard was in Nevada, Missouri.

He started his career at the Harvard Business School as an assistant dean in 1925. Over the course of his forty-year career as a faculty member, he became the Williston Professor of Investment Management at the Harvard Business School. He authored two books and many academic articles. He was also the editor of the Harvard Business Review and the Harvard Business School Alumni Bulletin. He became professor emeritus in 1965.

Bates also worked at Yale Law School (1930–38) as Sterling Research Associate and then lecturer in law.

During World War II Bates was the director of instruction for the U.S. Navy Supply Corps Midshipmen-Officers School (1943–45). He was also a member of the New England Committee for the Quartermaster Corps for testing cold weather and mountaineering equipment (1942–44).

In Investment Management: A Casebook, Bates presents many business cases of investment management. Reviewing it for The Journal of Finance, University of Washington professor Fred J. Mueller suggested the cases were outdated. Meanwhile, French industrial economist Jacques Houssiaux said in Revue économique that the cases could not be applied to the French context, though he hoped the book would inspire French investment managers.

Bates was an advisor to the Institute of Business Administration at Istanbul University in Turkey (1959–60, 1962–65), and to the government of Tunisia (1967). He participated in the Expedition for the Archaeological Exploration of Sardis with faculty from Harvard and Cornell University (1967–71).

Bates was an honorary curator of the Byzantine coins and seals section of the Fogg Museum. He was the author of a book about Byzantine coins. He was a fellow of the American Numismatic Society.

In retirement Bates published A Bates-Breed Ancestry to document a lifetime of work digging into the genealogy of his and wife's ancestors, including all maternal lines, going back at least 11 generations, to the 16th century in many cases.

== Personal life, death and legacy ==
Bates was married in Lynn, Massachusetts, on April 11, 1931, to Dorothea Breed of Lynn and they had two sons, George Preston and Nathaniel Breed. They resided first in Lexington and then in Concord, Massachusetts. Dorothea died in 1943. In 1949, Bates married Louise MacMillan in Boston. They lived in Gloucester, Massachusetts, for a while and then on Beacon Street in Boston's Back Bay. On his retirement in 1965, they moved to Camden, Maine.

Bates served on several board and committees in Concord, including the planning board and the library committee. He also served as vice president of Emerson Hospital and was a member of the Governor's Committee on Public Transportation (Massachusetts).

Bates was a member of the Society of Colonial Wars, the Somerset Club, the Country Club of Brookline and the Vine Book Hunt Club. An avid sailor, he was a member first of Eastern Point Yacht Club in Gloucester (commodore 1949–53), later of Camden Yacht Club, as well as of the Yacht Racing Union of Massachusetts Bay. His sailboat Sunshine was named after Sunshine Biscuit, Inc., successor name of the Loose-Wiles Biscuit Company founded by his great uncle Jacob L. Loose and his brother Joseph. Bates was also an honorary trustee of the New England Historic Genealogical Society.

Bates died on September 25, 1992, in Camden.

Bates is the namesake of an endowed chair at the Harvard Business School held by Luis Viciera

== Works ==
- Bates, George E. (1959). Investment Management: A Casebook. New York: McGraw-Hill. OCLC 66113099.
- Bates, George E. (1971). Byzantine Coins. Cambridge, Massassachusetts: Harvard University Press. ISBN 9780674089655. OCLC 185400901.
- Bates, George E. (1975). A Bates-Breed Ancestry. Boston, Massassachusetts: privately printed. LCCN 75-9406.

== Archives and records ==
- George Eugene Bates papers at Baker Library Special Collections, Harvard Business School
