= Brendan Smialowski =

American photographer

Brendan Smialowski is a photographer based in Washington, D.C., where he has created a large volume of work covering politics.

== Biography ==
Born circa 1981, Smialowski studied ancient history at the University of Missouri. He is a photojournalist for Agence France-Presse since 2012. He has been covering Washington, D.C. politics and events since 2003. He specializes in digital photography and covers national and international news. While primarily a photojournalist, his work includes a variety of techniques including portrait photography. He regularly covers the White House and Capitol Hill and he has covered several US presidential campaigns, including the 2008 US presidential campaign.

Smialowski's work can be seen in The New York Times, Time, Newsweek, U.S. News & World Report, Der Spiegel, Le Point, USA Today, The Washington Post, and many other publications.

In January 2021, his photograph of Bernie Sanders sitting in a chair at the inauguration of Joe Biden went viral.

== Awards ==
- 2018 - 75th Pictures of the Year International competition:

- General News category: Award of Excellence
- News Picture Story category: Award of Excellence

- 2018 - WHNPA Awards:

- Political Portfolio - First Place
- Domestic News - Second Place
- Picture Story/Politics - Third Place
- Sports Feature/Reaction - Award of Excellence
- Portfolio - Award of Excellence

- 2017 - WHNPA Eyes of History Still Contest - First Place, Political Picture Story
- 2015 - WHNPA Eyes of History Still Contest - Political Photo of the Year
- 2010 - WHNPA Eyes of History, Capitol Hill Category, Editorial - First Place
