= Thomas Franklin Fairfax Millard =

American journalist

Thomas Franklin Fairfax Millard (July 8, 1868, in Missouri – September 7, 1942, in Seattle, Washington) was an American journalist, newspaper editor, founder of the China Weekly Review, author of seven influential books on the Far East and first American political adviser to the Chinese Republic, serving for over fifteen years. Millard was "the founding father of American journalism in China", and "the dean of American newspapermen in the Orient," who "probably has had a greater influence on contemporary newspaper journalism than any other American journalist in China.” Millard was a war correspondent for the New York Herald during the Spanish–American War, the Boer War, the Boxer Uprising, the Russo-Japanese War and the Second Sino-Japanese War; he also had articles appear in such publications as The New York Times, New York World, New York Herald, New York Herald Tribune, Scribner's Magazine, The Nation and The Cosmopolitan, as well as in Britain's Daily Mail and the English-language Kobe Weekly Chronicle of Japan. Millard was the Shanghai correspondent for The New York Times from 1925. Millard was involved in the Twain-Ament Indemnities Controversy, supporting the attacks of Mark Twain on American missionary William Scott Ament.

== Biographical details ==
Thomas Franklin Fairfax Millard was born in Rolla, Missouri, on July 8, 1868, the son of Tennesseans Alvin Marion Millard (born about 1830), a merchant, and his wife Elizabeth E. Smith (born about 1840). By 1870 Millard was living at Piney, Texas County, Missouri, with his parents; Samuel Millard (born about 1805), his grandfather; his uncles, George F. Millard (born about 1833), Cristie F. Millard (born about 1846), Patric H. Smith (born about 1850); and his mother's sister, Callie C. Smith (born about 1848).

=== Education ===
Millard attended the Missouri School of Mines and Metallurgy (now the Missouri University of Science and Technology) at Rolla, Missouri, from 1878 to 1882, and the University of Missouri from 1884, during the presidency of The Rev. Dr. Samuel Spahr Laws (1824–1921). Millard was a member of the Beta Theta Pi fraternity, and graduated in 1888.

=== Honors ===
In June 1929 Millard received an honorary Doctor of Laws degree from the University of Missouri. Millard received the Order of the Jade from the Chinese government.

== Millard as journalist ==
=== St Louis Republic (1895–1898) ===
In 1895 Millard began his career in journalism at the St. Louis Republic, "the oldest newspaper west of the Mississippi River, which carried the slogan "America's Foremost Democratic Newspaper" on its masthead". Millard was eventually dismissed from this position due to "a characteristic fit of stubbornness" for refusing to cover a fire.

=== The New York Herald (1897–1911) ===
After his termination at the St. Louis Republic, Millard became as a drama critic for the New York Herald in 1897.

==== Greco-Turkish War (1897) ====
Millard was war correspondent for The New York Herald during the five-week Greco-Turkish War, which ended with a victory for Turkey on May 21, 1897.

==== Spanish–American War (1898) ====
Millard covered the Spanish–American War in Puerto Rico, reporting on the capture of Cuomo in August 1898.

While covering the war in Cuba, Millard's interview with American Major General William Shafter after his deportation of fellow correspondent Henry Sylvester "Harry" Scovel (1869–1905) of the New York World for disobeying a military order, resulted in Joseph Pulitzer, publisher of the New York World, firing Scovel. During his time in Cuba, Millard helped feed the starving New York Herald sketch artist and realist painter William Glackens.

==== Central America ====
Millard reported on hostilities in Central America for the New York Herald.

==== Second Boer War (1898–1900) ====
Millard covered the Second Boer War by accompanying the Boer forces for both "The New York Herald" and the London Daily Mail. Millard was able to interview Boer commandant general Louis Botha (born September 27, 1862; died August 27, 1919) in July 1900 after the fall of Pretoria, in which Botha criticised State President of the South African Republic (Transvaal) Paul Kruger and the War Office for their conduct of the war. Millard's writings on the Afrikaner struggle, especially his dispatches criticizing British colonialists and glorifying their enemy, so enraged the British commander Lord Kitchener, that Millard was deported from the country before the cessation of hostilities.

==== Philippine–American War (1900) ====
Millard was among the war correspondents who covered the Philippine insurrection.

==== Boxer Uprising (1900) ====
Millard covered the Boxer Uprising in 1900 for the New York Herald. In the aftermath of the Uprising, Millard denounced the Allied Powers and their insistence on punitive indemnities. "Seized with a vertigo of indiscriminating vengeance," in 1901 he wrote

the powers are trifling with the peace of the world. Events such as the months of September, October and November [1900] brought to China have carried war back to the Dark Ages, and will leave a taint in the moral atmosphere of the world for a generation to come.

In January 1901 Millard supported fellow anti-imperialist Mark Twain in his controversy with American Congregationalist missionary to China, William Scott Ament over the collection of indemnities from Chinese subjects. In 1901, Millard toured the United States with American pioneer cinematographer C. Fred Ackerman of the American Mutoscope and Biograph Company presenting an illustrated propagandist lecture "War in China", which included both lantern slides and films shot during the Boxer Uprising by Ackerman.

==== Russo-Japanese War (1904–1905) ====
In 1904 Millard was in Manchuria reporting the Russo-Japanese War. In his reports, Millard "provided some of the most accurate insights into the changing nature of modern war." While Millard spent most of the war with the Russian forces in Manchuria, and was allowed in the battle zone, "his initial sympathy for the Russians did not deter his recognition of the superior adaptation of modern techniques by the Japanese forces."

==== Korea (1905) ====
After the conclusion of the Russo-Japanese War, Millard was able to travel to Korea, where he reported on the Japanese occupation of Korea.

==== Moro Rebellion (1907–1908) ====
In 1907 Millard visited the Philippine Islands. One of the issues Millard reported on was the Moro Rebellion. In an article filed from Zamboanga in December 1907, published in The New York Times on March 15, 1908, and subsequently reprinted in both the Mindanao Herald on May 16, 1908, and the Washington Post, Millard revealed allegedly pernicious features of Moro society (including slavery, polygamy, concubinage, piracy and despotism) that were tolerated by the American administration in Manila due to the agreement between Brigadier General John C. Bates and Jamalul Kiram II, the Sultan of Sulu, in August 1899 that promised to respect the religion and customs of the Moros and the authority of the sultan in his own territory in exchange for recognition of American authority over the Sulu archipelago. Millard described the situation: "The laws were crude and their administration barbaric." Millard called for the abrogation of the Bates Treaty as it undermined American authority and was inconsistent with American laws and mores. Millard also described the danger for American military in Moroland, especially from the juramentada, "a type of religious fanatic who occasionally gets it into his crazy head to draw his barong and run amuck."

=== The China Press (1911–1917) ===
Millard remained in the Far East following the war and was active in both journalism and business. After the fall of the Qing Dynasty in 1911, as it was a time of political transition in China characterized by disorder and lack of authority, Millard and those associated with him were able to engage effectively in advocacy journalism. According to Paul French, "Millard was reasonably academic and precise in his advocacy for China".

In August 1911 Millard co-founded with Dr. Wu Tingfang (born 1842 in Singapore; died June 23, 1922), former Chinese envoy to the United States and later acting premier of China, and Y.C. Tong, The China Press, (Ta Lu Pao) a Shanghai daily, that was "the first US-owned newspaper in China, excluding missionary publications." Its "American style" soon brought a rapid circulation increase, increasing to four to five thousand daily by the mid-1920s.

The editorial offices of The China Press were located originally at Lane 126, 11 Szechuan Road, Shanghai, a block from The Bund, and later at 14 Kiukiang Road (Jiujiang Lu) in Shanghai. Among those journalists Millard recruited for The China Press were Carl Crow, and Charles Herbert Webb. As originally conceived, The China Press "was to be a truly international newspaper with headlines dictated by world events and not dissimilar in layout to the New York Herald-Tribune." Benjamin Fleischer, founder of Yokohama-based Japan Advertiser, and wealthy American industrialist Charles R. Crane supplied most of the finances for the purchase of equipment. Millard was often subsidized by Crane to the tune of $500 a month, and at times by various Chinese governments.

Millard intended "to make the enterprise "substantially Chinese in backing and sympathy," among other things breaking with the colonial convention of ignoring "native" news." According to Paul French,

Millard had started The China Press partly with the vision that the paper should promote contact between the foreign community and the Chinese. He went so far as to install several prominent Chinese on the paper's board of directors and actively sought to promote China stories to the front pages using the adage that news about China should be treated in the same way as the big New York papers covered US news.

The China Press's support for the government of the nascent Republic of China, resulted in an exclusive weekly interview with prominent Chinese politician Dr. Sun Yat-sen, the first provisional President of the Republic of China and co-founder of the Kuomintang. Even after Dr. Sun's "retirement" and replacement as president by Yuan Shikai, "Millard decided that he would provide continued blanket coverage of Sun and his ideas despite his political sidelining."

Millard edited the paper for six years. While The China Press became "the widest-circulating English-language daily newspaper in Shanghai", competition from the rival British-owned North China Daily News, and reduced advertising revenue due to Millard's perceived anti-British reporting on World War I, forced Millard to resign as editor in 1917. In 1918 Millard sold The China Press to Edward Ezra, a British Jewish businessman. Ownership eventually passed to Hollington Kong Tong in the fall of 1930.

=== Millard's Review of the Far East (1917–1922) ===
On Saturday June 9, 1917, Millard co-founded with John Benjamin Powell (1886–1947), a new journal, "Millard's Review of the Far East" (Mileshi pinglun bao), a weekly Shanghai English-language publication. "Honest direct reporting from Shanghai covering news of the Far East and relations with the United States became a goal" for Millard when he founded the Review, which was modeled after the influential American political journal The New Republic edited by Herbert Croly and Walter Lippmann, and anti-imperialistic Oswald Garrison Villard's The Nation. Its editorial offices were at what is now named the Union Building, Shanghai, a six-storey Neo-Renaissance building opened in 1916, then considered No.4 The Bund.

Acting on Millard's conviction that it should publish "Anything we damn please", it featured original reporting, reports on China-related subjects, and opinion. Coverage of the development of the May Fourth Movement in Shanghai helped further its cause. In the Review, Millard criticised the policies of many of Shanghai's leading foreigners, and championed Sun Yat-sen, Chiang Kai-shek and the Kuomintang army.

As Millard was often absent overseas in Europe or the United States, he left the management of the Review to Powell. In 1922 Millard sold his share of the magazine to Powell, who had renamed it on June 4, 1921 The Weekly Review of the Far East: Devoted to the Economic, Political and Social Development of China and Its Intercourse with other Nations, and in June 1923, The China Weekly Review.

=== The Missouri News Colony in China ===
Millard recruited often from his alma mater, the University of Missouri's School of Journalism, and was influenced by the recommendations of its dean Walter Williams, with the result that there was from 1911 a "Missouri News Colony" which was "one of the recognized groups of foreign journalists alongside the large British contingent and a smaller caucus of Australians" in Shanghai. Known variously as the Missouri mafia, the Corn Cobbers, and the Cowboy Correspondents, the group included Millard, Charles Crow; Edgar Snow; John Benjamin Powell; John W. Powell; Morris J. Harris chief of the Associated Press bureau in China; John Harris of UP; H.S. Jewell; Victor Keene of the New York Herald Tribune; Hollington Kong Tong (董顯光 pinyin: Dong, Xian‘guang) (born November 9, 1887; died January 10, 1971, in New York city), later Ambassador from Nationalist China to the U.S. (April 5, 1956, to 1957); Henry Francis Misselwitz (born July 24, 1900, in Leavenworth, Kansas), correspondent for The New York Times and the United Press in Japan and China from 1923 to 1936; and Joseph Glenn Babb, chief Associated Press correspondent in China.

=== The New York Times (1925–1927) ===
In 1925 Millard became the first China correspondent for The New York Times.

==== Dismissal ====
In the immediate aftermath of the Shanghai massacre of 1927 and the shelling of Nanjing by American and British forces in April 1927, The New York Times dismissed Millard, "far the ablest reporter of Far Eastern affairs" and replaced him with Frederick Moore (born November 17, 1877, in New Orleans, Louisiana; died 1956), former foreign councilor to the Japanese Minister of Foreign Affairs, because of Millard's sympathy for the Kuomintang. Confidential assessment by the British Foreign Office on Millard's dismissal indicated its favour with this development:

Mr. Millard, who until this week has " covered " Shanghai, did not give the impression of being too friendlily disposed towards Great Britain, and was, in addition, inclined to wax a trifle sentimental over the struggles of China to overthrow foreign aggression.

On April 18, 1927, Time magazine protested Millard's dismissal:

In Manhattan, the fact that the meticulously accurate Times has ceased to employ Mr. Thomas F. Millard as its correspondent in China aroused comment. His work has been of such high, impartial character that contemporary historians writing upon China have nearly all referred to his despatches. Replacing Mr. Millard, the Times has sent to China, Correspondent Frederick Moore. Of him the American Committee for Justice to China, in Manhattan, said, last week, is a circular news despatch: "Many letters of protest have been and are being sent to the Editor of the New York Times asking for the dismissal of Mr. Frederick Moore, whose strong-prejudices and interests make him incompetent as an impartial gatherer of news."

=== New York World (1927–1929) ===
Millard was then employed by the New York World.

=== The New York Times (1929–1942) ===
However, when Moore resigned to become an adviser to the Japanese government in 1929, Millard was rehired by The New York Times, a position he held until his death in 1942.

==== Second Sino-Japanese War (1937) ====
Millard covered part of the Second Sino-Japanese War, and was high on the Japanese blacklist because of his anti-Japanese sentiments.

== Millard as Adviser to the Chinese Government ==
Between 1919 and 1935, Millard shuttled between advising the Chinese government and journalism. He was adviser to the Chinese at the Paris Peace Conference, the League of Nations sessions from 1920 to 1922, the Far East conference in Washington in 1921.

=== Paris Peace Conference (1919) ===
After the conclusion of World War I, in December 1918, Millard left China and traveled to Europe to attend the 1919 Paris Peace Conference as the personal secretary of Charles R. Crane, and as an unofficial adviser to the Chinese delegation in negotiating the Treaty of Versailles. In May 1919 Millard attempted unsuccessfully to have Japan sign a declaration to resolve the Shandong Problem, namely to restore to China the territory granted to Germany in Shandong province in 1897 that was captured by Japan in 1914. The Japanese delegation objected to Millard's presence in the discussions. In response to the February 1919 proposal by Japan to insert a racial equality statement in the charter for the League of Nations,

Millard saw the proposal principally as having a propaganda value for the Japanese and believed that the United States had nothing to fear from it as it was merely 'a placation of Japan and Asiatic peoples', [and] "considered the Japanese proposal as being too vaguely worded to have any effective threat value."

=== US Senate Committee on Foreign Relations (1919) ===
After the signing of the Versailles Treaty on June 28, 1919, Millard subsequently testified on behalf of the Chinese government before the US Senate Committee on Foreign Relations, which ultimately rejected ratification of the Treaty,

In July 1919 while in Washington, D.C., Millard revealed publicly his belief that there was a secret tripartite entente between Britain, France and Japan in regard to the Shandong Problem and accepting "Japanese suzerainty" over Manchuria, and portions of China thus destroying "the political autonomy and territorial integrity of China as is guaranteed by the Hay Doctrine", and "would practically eliminate the United States from political influence and commercial equal opportunity in Asia." On July 25, 1919, Millard spoke to members of the US Congress at a dinner in his honour on the relations between China and Japan and on the Shandong Problem. Millard also revealed that there were efforts to suppress his book on the Eastern question by Federal agents of the United States, but were terminated after support from US President Woodrow Wilson.

=== League of Nations (1920–1922) ===
Millard was appointed an adviser to the Chinese delegation to the League of Nations in Geneva, Switzerland serving in this capacity until 1922.

=== Conference on Limitation of Armament and Pacific Problems (1921) ===
Millard advised the Chinese government at the Conference on Limitation of Armament and Pacific Problems held in Washington, D.C., in 1921, before returning to the Far East. This Conference resulted in the signing on February 4, 1922, of a treaty between China and Japan on the withdrawal of Japanese troops from Shandong, and on February 6, 1922, the Washington Nine Power Treaty on the Sovereignty of China, by representatives of the United States, United Kingdom, Japan, France, Italy, Belgium, Netherlands, Portugal, and China, which embodied "the principle of recognizing China's sovereignty and territorial integrity". This treaty went into force on December 31, 1922.

=== Presidential adviser (1922) ===
In 1922 moved to Beijing, then capital of the Republic of China, after being named adviser to Li Yuanhong, president of the Chinese Republic.

=== Extraterritoriality Treaty Revisions (1929–1930) ===
In 1929 began working for the Chinese Nationalists, the Kuomintang, In June 1929, the Chinese government sent Millard, to the United States to lobby for the abolition of extraterritoriality in China which had been re-established in the Boxer Protocol (Xinchou Treaty) of September 1901. Millard discussed problems in Sino-American Relations at the White House and at the State Department. The three major points he attempted to communicate were:

1. the isolation of the American legation at Beijing and the advantages of moving it to China's new capital at Nanjing;

2. the replacement of the American envoy to China, John Van Antwerp MacMurray (1881–1960) (served 9 April 1925 to 22 November 1929), because of the apparent hostility between him and the Chinese Foreign Minister, Wang Zhengting;
3. the Americans should support China in their attempts to abolish extraterritoriality by 1 January 1930.

MacMurray was dismissed November 22, 1929, and replaced by Nelson T. Johnson on December 16, 1929. However, Millard but was unable to secure American support for the abolition of extraterritoriality. In August 1929 Millard blamed "the apparent collusion between Washington and London and tried to show Hornbeck that persistent refusal of treaty revision would inevitably drive China to unilateral action." During the subsequent discussions for the renegotiation of the Unequal Treaties, Millard observed in his book Extraterritoriality in China (1931) that Britain and the United States would not give up unless China took unilateral action and forced the two powers to react: "Talk will not move them now in Washington or London. It requires action." Millard recommended suspending the negotiations, and then abolishing all treaty provisions.

=== Dismissal (1935) ===
In the September 7, 1935, edition of the China Weekly Review founded by Millard, it was announced that Millard intended to return to his work as a writer. In October 1935, just after his return to Shanghai on September 25 from several years in the United States, Millard was dismissed as a government adviser to the Nationalist government, as "[h]is inflammatory anti-Japanese feelings ran counter to Chiang's policy of appeasement."

== Later years and death ==
Unmarried, in his late sixties, and feeling he belonged in China as much as any place, Millard stayed in Shanghai until he broke his shoulder in a fall in front of the American Club. On June 23, 1941, Millard sailed from Manila, the Philippines, on the Titania, and arrived in Los Angeles on July 11, 1941. Sometime afterward, Millard went to Seattle to recover with relatives and never returned. After a period in a sanitarium in Wheeler, Oregon, until the end of August 1942, Millard died of cancer on September 7, 1942, in Seattle.

== Personal description ==
Millard was "a well known man-about-town in Shanghai in 1911. He lived in the smart Astor House Hotel, and was renowned for his snappy dress and abilities on the dance floor, as well as his established liberal views." By 1917, colleague John B. Powell described Millard as "a short, slender man weighing perhaps 125 pounds", who was considered "suave and immaculately dressed" Powell's son, journalist John W. Powell described Millard in later years:

About Millard, I only knew him in his later years, but he was still very much of a personality, elegant, white haired, charismatic, belting down martinis, and chasing and being chased. He was always charming and considerate to me. Dad was very fond of him and always said he learned a lot from Tommy, but also discovered early that he was difficult to work with.

According to Hamilton, Millard was "cocky and often rude, always dressed fashionably and lived comfortably. He was immaculate, even when covering a battle." As a war correspondent for the New York Herald, Millard earned a disfiguring facial scar in the process. Historian Mordechai Rozanski described Millard as "an adventurer, a romantic, a muckraker, and a progressive. He had a sense of mission that many who lived in the Midwest and Missouri carried with them into the world.

== Professional evaluation ==
According to Peter Rand, Millard's writing was at times "brilliant" and "inspiring". Referring specifically to Millard's career in China:

Millard was the patriarch of the China Hand journalists. Millard was the misfit par excellence, who established the rules of the game. He was a bantam-sized man and all else may have stemmed from that fact.... Millard flourished as a war correspondent.

As early as 1906, Millard was described as "one of the more critical and trustworthy students of the Orient and its problems". A reviewer of his 1928 book China: Where it is Today and Why, indicated that "Probably no journalist in the world is better prepared to write about Chinese affairs than Thomas F. Millard."Time magazine referred to Millard in 1925 as "the most eloquent American voice in the Far East," and in 1927 described him as "the meticulous and widely quoted correspondent of the New York Times," while elsewhere he was considered "the fairest American correspondent in China." By 1938, Millard was "considered the greatest American expert on Chinese affairs."

In an obituary in Time magazine just after his death in 1942, Millard was eulogised as: "More honest than discreet, he was a frequent critic of U.S. policy in China, a more strenuous critic of Japanese policy." In 1946, a four years after Millard's death, his contributions to journalism was described: "The articles of Thomas F. Millard, a veteran correspondent with a perspicacity which penetrated the Oriental mind and an amazing flair for prophecy."

== Beliefs ==
According to his protégé Edgar Snow, Millard was "anti-colonial, anti-imperialist, pro-independence, pro-equality of nations, pro-Republican, pro-self-determination and very pro-American." In 1925 Time magazine described Millard as "a hard-headed imperialist thinking in terms of weltpolitik for a "parochially-minded" Republic." Millard had read expansionists Captain Alfred Thayer Mahan, Albert J. Beveridge, and Brooks Adams. ... [H]is experiences in the Boer, Greco-Turkish, Spanish–American and Russo-Japanese wars convinced him that America had a special role to play in the Far East."

=== Millard and Britain ===
Millard hated imperialism, especially the colonialism of Britain. Covering the Second Boer War in South Africa he developed a lifelong case of Anglophobia.

=== Millard and Japan ===
Millard opposed the expansion of the Empire of Japan and was considered to be anti-Japanese as he saw the incompatibility of Japanese and American interests and because of his own observations of Korea under Japanese rule and the Japanese treatment of Koreans after the occupation of Korea in 1905, arguing that the images of Japan in Europe and America were the propaganda from the Japanese press bureau. The American Asiatic Association "made no secret of its disrespect for Mr. Millard, a man possessed of "a more or less acute form of Japophobia". Millard "feared that ... an anti-Western Japan would guide the Chinese masses". Millard claimed he had "positive evidence of the existence of a systematic and well-developed plan of Japan to control and manipulate" Chinese public opinion against westerners and to eliminate them from China. In his book Our Eastern Question (1916), Millard wrote

From what I know of Japan, inside and outside, I am convinced that Western knowledge of darkest Russia is as the noonday sun to the moon compared to general Western understanding of internal forces which sway the policy of Nippon.

Millard opposed publicly Japan's Twenty-One Demands made on China in January 1915, and with Stanley K. Hornbeck participated in seminars in Wisconsin "to stir up anti-Japanese excitement". Millard contended that "Japan employed bludgeoning tactics all through the negotiations. She reinforced her military forces in Shantung and Manchuria and made strategical dispositions unmistakably directed against China." In response to the Japanese opposition to the California Alien Land Law of 1913 which prohibited the transfer of land rights to aliens ineligible for citizenship, including the Japanese, in March 1916 Millard wrote an article, "The Japanese Menace" in The Century, arguing that status quo be maintained as Japanese demands threatened American sovereignty in its own land, and furthered the advancement of Japanese economic superiority over Korea, China, and Manchuria. In reviewing Millard's 1916 book The Eastern Question, The Missionary Review of the World indicated: "If one distrusts or dislikes Japan, he will read this volume." In late 1918, before he left China to attend the Paris Peace Conference, Millard warned that close attention had to be paid to the fact that the Japanese delegation included Prince Konoe Fumimaro, later three-time Prime Minister of Japan, who wrote the sensational and provocative anti-Anglo-American and anti-establishment essay "Reject the Anglo-American-Centered Peace". Millard not only had it translated and published in his journal, Millard's Review, but also wrote a rebuttal. The Japanese delegation also included John Russell Kennedy, "Japan's propaganda manager" and Millard's bête noire.

=== Millard and Korea ===
In November 1918, after a speech by Charles R. Crane in Shanghai advocating Woodrow Wilson's policies of self-determination for all nations, Korean nationalist Yuh Woon-Hyung (Yŏ Unhyŏng), then principal of a Korean School in Shanghai, and others drafted a petition calling for Korean independence from Japan, and requesting action at the upcoming Paris Peace Conference, which he gave both to Crane and also to Millard for personal transmission to Woodrow Wilson. Manela indicates that

Although Millard was sympathetic to the Korean cause and conceded that in principle Koreans were as entitled to self-determination as anyone, he thought there was little chance that the Korean case would actually come before the conference.

=== Millard and China ===
Millard was a Sinophile. In 1906 Millard "admitted to once holding an "adverse disposition" toward the Chinese but the more he became acquainted with them the more he developed "a sincere liking and admiration of the Chinese people." He recognized that one could not easily identify social characteristics with a race, but he considered the Chinese "industrious, reliable, law-abiding, good humored, capable, and tolerant."

Millard was an early supporter of the Chinese Nationalists and the 1911 Revolution, advocating through his writing a strong and independent China. Millard supported Sun Yat-sen and Chiang Kai-shek "in the belief that they would undertake policies that would cure China's ills."

Millard has been described as an Open Door Realist, advocating passionately the view that the Open Door Policy in China, which upheld Chinese territorial and administrative integrity and advocated no interference with the free use of the treaty ports within their spheres of influence in China, should be backed by American military force as necessary. For Millard, the Open Door Policy involved the establishment of an American economic protectorate over China. Soon after the armistice of 1918 Millard strongly urged the United States to take an active and leading part in the reconstruction of China. Millard warned that "our Eastern policy will not be respected until the world is convinced that failure to consider and meet our reasonable wishes carries a probability of war".

=== Millard on the relationship between China and the United States of America ===
According to Japanese historian Akira Iriye, "Outside the American government, one of the most vocal and persistent spokesmen for special ties between the United States and China was Thomas F. Millard". Millard professed to see "a genuine community of interests with China and the United States" and believed his views on China were "analogous to the views of a considerable portion of the American people." Millard influenced strongly and then supported the China policies of US President William Howard Taft (President 1909–1913), who indicated in a speech to the American Association at the Astor House, Shanghai on October 8, 1907, a year before his election as President of the United States, that he favoured the economic and political development of China:

The American Chinese trade is sufficiently great to require the Government of the United States to take every legitimate means to protect it against discrimination or injury by the political preference of any of its competitors.

After the speech, Millard followed Taft to the rostrum and declared,

We have a hopeful interest, through commerce, in the enormous, the almost incalculable material development which the application of modern western influence and methods to the teeming resources of China is sure to bring about. ... Am I going too far to declare that China and America need each other, that in some important matters their futures are inseparably linked?

Millard sought to influence the foreign policy elite, and in this task he was helped by friends with influence and money, such as Willard Dickerman Straight (born January 31, 1880; died December 1, 1918), an American journalist who later served as a diplomat in China, Korea and Manchuria; and Charles R. Crane, a wealthy confidante of American President Woodrow Wilson (President 1913–1921), who devoted his life to pushing the concept of a special US relationship with China and Asia. According to John Maxwell Hamilton,

Millard was not opposed to enlarging American commerce in China, so long as that commerce helped the Chinese. He stridently criticized the [Shanghai American] Chamber of Commerce, bankers, and other Americans who resisted change in order to preserve United States business interests and imperial life styles in the foreign concessions. He called on the United States government, whose views he tried to shape, to adopt a policy of "felicitous aggressiveness," meaning it should become the prime force for helping China even if the effort required economic warfare against other powers.

=== Millard and Philippine independence ===
After an absence of many years, in 1925 Millard visited the Philippines where he wrote several articles for The New York Herald Tribune, where he opposed Philippine independence, and advocated the United States keep the Philippines permanently. Millard's reasons included:

1. the corruption of Filipino politicians from 1916–1921 under the Jones Act;
2. even if they should acquire self-governing capacity, "it is fallacious to presume that the right of self-government and the right of independence are identical."
3. the inability of an independent Philippines to maintain it against foreign aggression;
4. independence is advocated primarily by the political and industrial bosses who hoped to profit by the disposal of government land;

5. the immense value to the USA of the government lands in the Philippines.

Amplifying the fifth point, Millard argued that the increasing population of the United States would eventually necessitate the importation of food and raw materials from the Philippines:

"Great uncultivated and unused regions in the Philippines which are ideal for the production of rubber, hemp, jute, coffee, vegetable oils and fats, camphor and quinine, now are a part of the public domain of the United States and are owned by the American people."

Millard also added that the iron ore deposits were among the largest in Asia, and that the uncertain political future prevented capital investment in the Philippines.

=== Millard and Native Americans in the United States ===
In a 1903 article published in The Forum, Millard perceived the cultural assimilation and Americanization of Native Americans in the United States into the white race and lamented the seeming inevitability of their extinction.

=== Censorship of the Press ===
Millard frequently highlighted and decried censorship of war correspondents, including both Japan and Russia in the Russo-Japanese War. In his 1906 book, The New Far East, which included sections from a 1905 article, Millard wrote

Although the scene of hostilities was far away from Japan, a strict censorship was maintained during and even after the war on press despatches sent out of the country, and this censorship was by no means confined to purely military matters. Yet so prejudiced is a very large section of the English press that it was not uncommon to see the Russian censorship bitterly condemned and the Japanese praised in the same column. It should be clear to even commonplace intelligence that both censorships were maintained for the same purpose, and with the same justification (or lack of it), and my knowledge of both leads me to believe the Russian was the more liberal, notwithstanding strong reasons why the opposite should be true."

Japanese restrictions prevented foreign journalists from getting closer than 3 miles (5 kilometres) from the battles. "In the end Japanese censorship prevented the hordes of correspondents from witnessing most of the decisive battles. Censorship was strict because the Japanese suspected that many of foreign journalists were spies", with the result that "Many chafed under the censorship and departed for home." When the war shifted to Manchuria, Millard complained: "Screened by a military censorship which prevented as far as possible publicity concerning events in the country, except such as was given out at Tokyo." Millard indicated that even after the conclusion of the Russo-Japanese War, "the Japanese continued to maintain a strict censorship upon communications leaving or entering Korea."

Again in 1905, Millard reported on censorship by American military authorities in the Philippines. Millard reported in Scribner's Magazine that military censorship in the Philippines was among the most strict anywhere. Millard rehearsed previous accusations against American General Elwell Stephen Otis (1838–1909) who provided misleading information to foreign correspondents and forced them to modify their reports of war crimes by American troops, resulting in the replacement of Otis in 1900.

When Millard started his The China Press in Shanghai in 1911, it was "registered in Delaware, to avoid censorship" by the Empire of China. As an American newspaper operating within the International Settlement, The China News was thus subject to American laws which protected the freedom of the press.
