= 2007 American Le Mans Series =

American motorsport season

Seasons
- ← 2006 2008 →

The 2007 American Le Mans Series season was the 37th season for the IMSA GT Championship, with the ninth labeled as the American Le Mans Series. It was a series for Le Mans Prototypes (LMP) and Grand Touring (GT) race cars divided into 4 classes: LMP1, LMP2, GT1, and GT2. It began March 17, 2007, and ended October 20, 2007 after 12 races. It was the league's longest season since 2000.

== Schedule ==
Rnd	Race	Length	Circuit	Location	Date
1	(United States) Mobil 1 12 Hours of Sebring	12 Hours	Sebring International Raceway	Sebring, Florida	March 17
2	(United States) Acura Sports Car Challenge of St. Petersburg	2 Hours 45 Minutes	St. Petersburg Street Circuit	St. Petersburg, Florida	March 31
3	(United States) Toyota Grand Prix of Long Beach	1 Hour 40 Minutes	Long Beach Street Circuit	Long Beach, California	April 14
4	(United States) Lone Star Grand Prix	2 Hours 45 Minutes	Reliant Park	Houston, Texas	April 21
5	(United States) Utah Grand Prix	2 Hours 45 Minutes	Miller Motorsports Park	Grantsville, Utah	May 19
6	(United States) Northeast Grand Prix	2 Hours 45 Minutes	Lime Rock Park	Lakeville, Connecticut	July 7
7	(United States) Acura Sports Car Challenge of Mid-Ohio	2 Hours 45 Minutes	Mid-Ohio	Lexington, Ohio	July 21
8	(United States) Generac 500 at Road America	4 Hours	Road America	Elkhart Lake, Wisconsin	August 11
9	(Canada) Mobil 1 presents Grand Prix of Mosport	2 Hours 45 Minutes	Mosport Park	Bowmanville, Ontario	August 26
10	(United States) Detroit Sports Car Challenge	2 Hours 45 Minutes	Belle Isle Street Circuit	Detroit, Michigan	September 1
11	(United States) Petit Le Mans	1000 Miles or 10 Hours	Road Atlanta	Braselton, Georgia	October 6
12	(United States) Monterey Sports Car Championships	4 Hours	Mazda Raceway Laguna Seca	Monterey, California	October 20

Following the ten race schedule of 2006, a twelve race schedule was announced for 2007. While the Portland International Raceway was not part of the new schedule, three new temporary street circuits were added. The St. Petersburg Street Circuit and the Long Beach Street Circuit were added after the 12 Hours of Sebring, while the new Belle Isle circuit was added before Petit Le Mans.

== Fuel supplier ==
=== Ethanol ===
Announced on February 8, 2007, the American Le Mans Series signed an agreement with the Ethanol Promotion and Information Council (EPIC) to run E10 ethanol-enriched fuel in all gasoline-powered entries. The fuel was 10% ethanol and 90% gasoline. EPIC also sponsored Rahal Letterman Racing's Porsche entry as part of the deal. This was similar to Rahal Letterman's deal in the Indy Racing League. From 2007 season onwards, VP Racing Fuels replaced Sunoco as official gasoline supplier for American Le Mans Series.

== Entry list ==
=== Le Mans Prototype 1 (LMP1) ===
Team	Chassis	Engine	Tyre	No.	Drivers	Rnds.
(United States) Team Cytosport	Lola B06/10	AER P32T 3.6 L Turbo V8	D	06	(United States) Greg Pickett	3, 7–8, 10–12
(United States) Team Cytosport	Lola B06/10	AER P32T 3.6 L Turbo V8	D	06	(Germany) Klaus Graf	3, 7–8, 10–12
(United States) Team Cytosport	Lola B06/10	AER P32T 3.6 L Turbo V8	D	06	(Mexico) Memo Gidley	11
(United States) Audi Sport North America	Audi R10 TDI	Audi TDI 5.5 L Turbo V12 (Diesel)	M	1	(Italy) Rinaldo Capello	All
(United States) Audi Sport North America	Audi R10 TDI	Audi TDI 5.5 L Turbo V12 (Diesel)	M	1	(United Kingdom) Allan McNish	All
(United States) Audi Sport North America	Audi R10 TDI	Audi TDI 5.5 L Turbo V12 (Diesel)	M	1	(Denmark) Tom Kristensen	1
(United States) Audi Sport North America	Audi R10 TDI	Audi TDI 5.5 L Turbo V12 (Diesel)	M	2	(Germany) Marco Werner	All
(United States) Audi Sport North America	Audi R10 TDI	Audi TDI 5.5 L Turbo V12 (Diesel)	M	2	(Italy) Emanuele Pirro	1–11
(United States) Audi Sport North America	Audi R10 TDI	Audi TDI 5.5 L Turbo V12 (Diesel)	M	2	(Germany) Frank Biela	1
(United States) Audi Sport North America	Audi R10 TDI	Audi TDI 5.5 L Turbo V12 (Diesel)	M	2	(Germany) Lucas Luhr	11
(United States) Audi Sport North America	Audi R10 TDI	Audi TDI 5.5 L Turbo V12 (Diesel)	M	2	(Germany) Mike Rockenfeller	12
(United Kingdom) Arena International Motorsport	Zytek 07S	Zytek 2ZG408 4.0 L V8	M	10	(United Kingdom) Tom Chilton	11–12
(United Kingdom) Arena International Motorsport	Zytek 07S	Zytek 2ZG408 4.0 L V8	M	10	(United Kingdom) Darren Manning	11–12
(United Kingdom) Arena International Motorsport	Zytek 07S	Zytek 2ZG408 4.0 L V8	M	10	(Japan) Hayanari Shimoda	11*, 12*
(United States) Autocon Motorsports	MG-Lola EX257 (1-3); Creation CA06/H (5-9, 11-12)	AER P07 2.0 L Turbo I4 (1-3); Judd GV5 5.0 L V10 (5-9, 11-12)	D	12	(United States) Michael Lewis	1–3, 5–6, 8, 11
(United States) Autocon Motorsports	MG-Lola EX257 (1-3); Creation CA06/H (5-9, 11-12)	AER P07 2.0 L Turbo I4 (1-3); Judd GV5 5.0 L V10 (5-9, 11-12)	D	12	(United States) Chris McMurry	1–3, 6–9, 11–12
(United States) Autocon Motorsports	MG-Lola EX257 (1-3); Creation CA06/H (5-9, 11-12)	AER P07 2.0 L Turbo I4 (1-3); Judd GV5 5.0 L V10 (5-9, 11-12)	D	12	(United States) Bryan Willman	1–2, 5, 7–8, 11–12
(United States) Autocon Motorsports	MG-Lola EX257 (1-3); Creation CA06/H (5-9, 11-12)	AER P07 2.0 L Turbo I4 (1-3); Judd GV5 5.0 L V10 (5-9, 11-12)	D	12	(Canada) Tony Burgess	9, 12
(United States) Intersport Racing	Creation CA06/H (1-10); Lola B06/10 (11-12)	Judd GV5 S2 5.0 L V10 (1-10); AER P32T 4.0 L Turbo V8 (11-12)	K D	37	(United States) Clint Field	All
(United States) Intersport Racing	Creation CA06/H (1-10); Lola B06/10 (11-12)	Judd GV5 S2 5.0 L V10 (1-10); AER P32T 4.0 L Turbo V8 (11-12)	K D	37	(United States) Jon Field	All
(United States) Intersport Racing	Creation CA06/H (1-10); Lola B06/10 (11-12)	Judd GV5 S2 5.0 L V10 (1-10); AER P32T 4.0 L Turbo V8 (11-12)	K D	37	(United States) Richard Berry	1–2, 4–6, 8, 10–12
(United Kingdom) Creation Autosportif	Creation CA07	Judd GV5.5 S2 5.5 L V10	D	88	(United Kingdom) Jamie Campbell-Walter	11–12
(United Kingdom) Creation Autosportif	Creation CA07	Judd GV5.5 S2 5.5 L V10	D	88	(Switzerland) Harold Primat	11–12
(United Kingdom) Creation Autosportif	Creation CA07	Judd GV5.5 S2 5.5 L V10	D	88	(France) Christophe Tinseau	11

=== Le Mans Prototype 2 (LMP2) ===
Team	Chassis	Engine	Tyre	No.	Drivers	Rnds.
(United Kingdom) Zytek Motorsports	Zytek 07S/2	Zytek ZG348 3.4 L V8	M	5	(Germany) Stefan Mücke	11–12
(United Kingdom) Zytek Motorsports	Zytek 07S/2	Zytek ZG348 3.4 L V8	M	5	(United Kingdom) Danny Watts	11
(United Kingdom) Zytek Motorsports	Zytek 07S/2	Zytek ZG348 3.4 L V8	M	5	(Czech Republic) Jan Charouz	11
(United Kingdom) Zytek Motorsports	Zytek 07S/2	Zytek ZG348 3.4 L V8	M	5	(Japan) Hayanari Shimoda	12
(United States) Penske Racing	Porsche RS Spyder Evo	Porsche MR6 3.4 L V8	M	6	(Germany) Sascha Maassen	All
(United States) Penske Racing	Porsche RS Spyder Evo	Porsche MR6 3.4 L V8	M	6	(Australia) Ryan Briscoe	All
(United States) Penske Racing	Porsche RS Spyder Evo	Porsche MR6 3.4 L V8	M	6	(France) Emmanuel Collard	1, 11
(United States) Penske Racing	Porsche RS Spyder Evo	Porsche MR6 3.4 L V8	M	7	(Germany) Timo Bernhard	All
(United States) Penske Racing	Porsche RS Spyder Evo	Porsche MR6 3.4 L V8	M	7	(France) Romain Dumas	All
(United States) Penske Racing	Porsche RS Spyder Evo	Porsche MR6 3.4 L V8	M	7	(Brazil) Hélio Castroneves	1
(United States) Penske Racing	Porsche RS Spyder Evo	Porsche MR6 3.4 L V8	M	7	(United States) Patrick Long	11
(United States) B-K Motorsports (Japan) Mazdaspeed	Lola B07/46	Mazda MZR-R 2.0 L Turbo I4	K	8	(United Kingdom) Ben Devlin	All
(United States) B-K Motorsports (Japan) Mazdaspeed	Lola B07/46	Mazda MZR-R 2.0 L Turbo I4	K	8	(United States) James Bach	All
(United States) B-K Motorsports (Japan) Mazdaspeed	Lola B07/46	Mazda MZR-R 2.0 L Turbo I4	K	8	(Brazil) Raphael Matos	1–2, 11
(United States) Highcroft Racing	Acura ARX-01a	Acura AL7R 3.4 L V8	M	9	(Australia) David Brabham	All
(United States) Highcroft Racing	Acura ARX-01a	Acura AL7R 3.4 L V8	M	9	(Sweden) Stefan Johansson	All
(United States) Highcroft Racing	Acura ARX-01a	Acura AL7R 3.4 L V8	M	9	(United States) Duncan Dayton	1
(United States) Highcroft Racing	Acura ARX-01a	Acura AL7R 3.4 L V8	M	9	(United Kingdom) Robbie Kerr	11–12
(Mexico) Lowe's Fernández Racing	Lola B06/43	Acura AL7R 3.4 L V8	M	15	(Mexico) Adrian Fernandez	All
(Mexico) Lowe's Fernández Racing	Lola B06/43	Acura AL7R 3.4 L V8	M	15	(Mexico) Luis Diaz	All
(Mexico) Lowe's Fernández Racing	Lola B06/43	Acura AL7R 3.4 L V8	M	15	(Mexico) David Martinez	1*
(United States) Dyson Racing Team	Porsche RS Spyder Evo	Porsche MR6 3.4 L V8	M	16	(United Kingdom) Andy Wallace	All
(United States) Dyson Racing Team	Porsche RS Spyder Evo	Porsche MR6 3.4 L V8	M	16	(United States) Butch Leitzinger	All
(United States) Dyson Racing Team	Porsche RS Spyder Evo	Porsche MR6 3.4 L V8	M	16	(United States) Andy Lally	1, 11
(United States) Dyson Racing Team	Porsche RS Spyder Evo	Porsche MR6 3.4 L V8	M	20	(United States) Chris Dyson	All
(United States) Dyson Racing Team	Porsche RS Spyder Evo	Porsche MR6 3.4 L V8	M	20	(United Kingdom) Guy Smith	All
(United States) Van der Steur Racing	Radical SR9	AER P07 2.0 L Turbo I4	K	19	(United States) Adam Pecorari	6–7, 9
(United States) Van der Steur Racing	Radical SR9	AER P07 2.0 L Turbo I4	K	19	(United States) Gunnar van der Steur	6–7, 9
(United States) Andretti Green Racing	Acura ARX-01a	Acura AL7R 3.4 L V8	M	26	(United States) Bryan Herta	All
(United States) Andretti Green Racing	Acura ARX-01a	Acura AL7R 3.4 L V8	M	26	(United Kingdom) Dario Franchitti	1, 3, 11*, 12*
(United States) Andretti Green Racing	Acura ARX-01a	Acura AL7R 3.4 L V8	M	26	(Brazil) Tony Kanaan	1, 11–12
(United States) Andretti Green Racing	Acura ARX-01a	Acura AL7R 3.4 L V8	M	26	(United Kingdom) Marino Franchitti	2, 4–10
(United States) Andretti Green Racing	Acura ARX-01a	Acura AL7R 3.4 L V8	M	26	(Brazil) Vítor Meira	11
(Switzerland) Horag Racing	Lola B05/40	Judd XV675 3.4 L V8	M	27	(Switzerland) Fredy Lienhard	1
(Switzerland) Horag Racing	Lola B05/40	Judd XV675 3.4 L V8	M	27	(Belgium) Didier Theys	1
(Switzerland) Horag Racing	Lola B05/40	Judd XV675 3.4 L V8	M	27	(Belgium) Eric van de Poele	1

=== Grand Touring 1 (GT1) ===
Team	Chassis	Engine	Tyre	No.	Drivers	Rnds.
(United States) Corvette Racing (United States) Pratt & Miller	Chevrolet Corvette C6.R	Chevrolet LS7.r 7.0 L V8	M	3	(United States) Johnny O'Connell	All
(United States) Corvette Racing (United States) Pratt & Miller	Chevrolet Corvette C6.R	Chevrolet LS7.r 7.0 L V8	M	3	(Denmark) Jan Magnussen	All
(United States) Corvette Racing (United States) Pratt & Miller	Chevrolet Corvette C6.R	Chevrolet LS7.r 7.0 L V8	M	3	(Canada) Ron Fellows	1, 11
(United States) Corvette Racing (United States) Pratt & Miller	Chevrolet Corvette C6.R	Chevrolet LS7.r 7.0 L V8	M	4	(United Kingdom) Oliver Gavin	All
(United States) Corvette Racing (United States) Pratt & Miller	Chevrolet Corvette C6.R	Chevrolet LS7.r 7.0 L V8	M	4	(Monaco) Olivier Beretta	All
(United States) Corvette Racing (United States) Pratt & Miller	Chevrolet Corvette C6.R	Chevrolet LS7.r 7.0 L V8	M	4	(Italy) Max Papis	1, 11
(United States) Corvette Racing (United States) Pratt & Miller	Chevrolet Corvette C6.R	Chevrolet LS7.r 7.0 L V8	M	33	(Canada) Ron Fellows	9
(United States) Corvette Racing (United States) Pratt & Miller	Chevrolet Corvette C6.R	Chevrolet LS7.r 7.0 L V8	M	33	(United States) Andy Pilgrim	9
(United States) Doran Racing	Maserati MC12 GT1	Maserati M144B/2 6.0 L V12	M	27	(Belgium) Didier Theys	8, 11
(United States) Doran Racing	Maserati MC12 GT1	Maserati M144B/2 6.0 L V12	M	27	(Switzerland) Fredy Lienhard	8, 11
(United States) Doran Racing	Maserati MC12 GT1	Maserati M144B/2 6.0 L V12	M	27	(Italy) Andrea Bertolini	11
(United States) Doran Racing	Maserati MC12 GT1	Maserati M144B/2 6.0 L V12	M	27	(Belgium) Eric van de Poele	11*
(United Kingdom) Team Modena	Aston Martin DBR9	Aston Martin AM04 6.0 L V12	M	63	(Spain) Antonio García	1
(United Kingdom) Team Modena	Aston Martin DBR9	Aston Martin AM04 6.0 L V12	M	63	(United Kingdom) Darren Turner	1
(United Kingdom) Team Modena	Aston Martin DBR9	Aston Martin AM04 6.0 L V12	M	63	(United States) Liz Halliday	1

=== Grand Touring 2 (GT2) ===
Team	Chassis	Engine	Tyre	No.	Drivers	Rnds.
(Germany) Konrad Motorsport	Porsche 996 GT3-RSR	Porsche M96/79 3.6 L Flat-6	Y	10	(Italy) Luciano Da Silva	1
(Germany) Konrad Motorsport	Porsche 996 GT3-RSR	Porsche M96/79 3.6 L Flat-6	Y	10	(United States) Philip Collin	1
(Germany) Konrad Motorsport	Porsche 996 GT3-RSR	Porsche M96/79 3.6 L Flat-6	Y	10	(Brazil) Antônio Hermann	1
(United States) Primetime Race Group	Dodge Viper Competition Coupe	Dodge Viper 8.3 L V10	M	11	(United States) Joel Feinberg	10–12
(United States) Primetime Race Group	Dodge Viper Competition Coupe	Dodge Viper 8.3 L V10	M	11	(United States) Chapman Ducote	10–12
(United States) Woodhouse Performance	Dodge Viper Competition Coupe	Dodge Viper 8.3 L V10	K	13	(United States) Cindi Lux	7
(United States) Woodhouse Performance	Dodge Viper Competition Coupe	Dodge Viper 8.3 L V10	K	13	(United States) Stan Wilson	7
(United States) Rahal Letterman Racing	Porsche 997 GT3-RSR	Porsche M97/77 3.8 L Flat-6	M	18	(Germany) Ralf Kelleners	All
(United States) Rahal Letterman Racing	Porsche 997 GT3-RSR	Porsche M97/77 3.8 L Flat-6	M	18	(United States) Tommy Milner	All
(United States) Rahal Letterman Racing	Porsche 997 GT3-RSR	Porsche M97/77 3.8 L Flat-6	M	18	(United States) Graham Rahal	1, 11
(United States) Panoz Team PTG	Panoz Esperante GT-LM	Ford (Elan) 5.0 L V8	Y	21	(United States) Bill Auberlen	1–7, 11–12
(United States) Panoz Team PTG	Panoz Esperante GT-LM	Ford (Elan) 5.0 L V8	Y	21	(United States) Joey Hand	1–7, 11–12
(United States) Panoz Team PTG	Panoz Esperante GT-LM	Ford (Elan) 5.0 L V8	Y	21	(United Kingdom) Tom Kimber-Smith	1, 11
(United States) Panoz Team PTG	Panoz Esperante GT-LM	Ford (Elan) 5.0 L V8	Y	22	(Canada) Scott Maxwell	1–5
(United States) Panoz Team PTG	Panoz Esperante GT-LM	Ford (Elan) 5.0 L V8	Y	22	(United States) Ross Smith	1–5
(United States) Panoz Team PTG	Panoz Esperante GT-LM	Ford (Elan) 5.0 L V8	Y	22	(United States) Bryan Sellers	1
(United States) Panoz Team PTG	Panoz Esperante GT-LM	Ford (Elan) 5.0 L V8	Y	22	(United States) Bill Auberlen	8–10
(United States) Panoz Team PTG	Panoz Esperante GT-LM	Ford (Elan) 5.0 L V8	Y	22	(United States) Joey Hand	8–10
(Monaco) JMB Racing	Ferrari F430 GTC	Ferrari F136 4.0 L V8	M	24	(United Kingdom) Ben Aucott	1
(Monaco) JMB Racing	Ferrari F430 GTC	Ferrari F136 4.0 L V8	M	24	(United Kingdom) Joe Macari	1
(Monaco) JMB Racing	Ferrari F430 GTC	Ferrari F136 4.0 L V8	M	24	(New Zealand) Rob Wilson	1
(United States) Petersen White Lightning	Ferrari F430 GTC	Ferrari F136 4.0 L V8	M	31	(Germany) Tim Bergmeister	1–3
(United States) Petersen White Lightning	Ferrari F430 GTC	Ferrari F136 4.0 L V8	M	31	(Czech Republic) Tomáš Enge	1–2, 5–7
(United States) Petersen White Lightning	Ferrari F430 GTC	Ferrari F136 4.0 L V8	M	31	(Mexico) Memo Gidley	1*
(United States) Petersen White Lightning	Ferrari F430 GTC	Ferrari F136 4.0 L V8	M	31	(Germany) Dirk Müller	3–4, 7–11
(United States) Petersen White Lightning	Ferrari F430 GTC	Ferrari F136 4.0 L V8	M	31	(Czech Republic) Jaroslav Janiš	4
(United States) Petersen White Lightning	Ferrari F430 GTC	Ferrari F136 4.0 L V8	M	31	(United Kingdom) Darren Turner	5–6
(United States) Petersen White Lightning	Ferrari F430 GTC	Ferrari F136 4.0 L V8	M	31	(United Kingdom) Peter Dumbreck	8–12
(United States) Petersen White Lightning	Ferrari F430 GTC	Ferrari F136 4.0 L V8	M	31	(Germany) Lucas Luhr	12
(United States) Corsa/White Lightning	Ferrari F430 GTC	Ferrari F136 4.0 L V8	M	32	(Portugal) Rui Águas	1
(United States) Corsa/White Lightning	Ferrari F430 GTC	Ferrari F136 4.0 L V8	M	32	(Italy) Maurizio Mediani	1
(United States) Corsa/White Lightning	Ferrari F430 GTC	Ferrari F136 4.0 L V8	M	32	(Argentina) José María López	1
(United States) Flying Lizard Motorsports	Porsche 997 GT3-RSR	Porsche M97/77 3.8 L Flat-6	M	44	(United States) Darren Law	1–4, 6, 8, 10–11
(United States) Flying Lizard Motorsports	Porsche 997 GT3-RSR	Porsche M97/77 3.8 L Flat-6	M	44	(United States) Lonnie Pechnik	1–2, 5, 7, 9, 11–12
(United States) Flying Lizard Motorsports	Porsche 997 GT3-RSR	Porsche M97/77 3.8 L Flat-6	M	44	(United States) Seth Neiman	1, 4–9, 11–12
(United States) Flying Lizard Motorsports	Porsche 997 GT3-RSR	Porsche M97/77 3.8 L Flat-6	M	44	(United States) Patrick Long	3, 10, 12
(United States) Flying Lizard Motorsports	Porsche 997 GT3-RSR	Porsche M97/77 3.8 L Flat-6	M	45	(Germany) Jörg Bergmeister	All
(United States) Flying Lizard Motorsports	Porsche 997 GT3-RSR	Porsche M97/77 3.8 L Flat-6	M	45	(United States) Johannes van Overbeek	All
(United States) Flying Lizard Motorsports	Porsche 997 GT3-RSR	Porsche M97/77 3.8 L Flat-6	M	45	(Germany) Marc Lieb	1, 11
(United States) Corsa Motorsports	Ferrari F430 GTC	Ferrari F136 4.0 L V8	M	48	(Portugal) Rui Águas	5
(United States) Corsa Motorsports	Ferrari F430 GTC	Ferrari F136 4.0 L V8	M	48	(Italy) Maurizio Mediani	5
(United States) Corsa Motorsports	Ferrari F430 GTC	Ferrari F136 4.0 L V8	M	48	(United States) Steve Pruitt	5*
(United States) Robertson Racing	Panoz Esperante GT-LM	Ford (Elan) 5.0 L V8	D	53	(United States) David Robertson	1, 10–12
(United States) Robertson Racing	Panoz Esperante GT-LM	Ford (Elan) 5.0 L V8	D	53	(United States) Andrea Robertson	1, 10–12
(United States) Robertson Racing	Panoz Esperante GT-LM	Ford (Elan) 5.0 L V8	D	53	(Netherlands) Arie Luyendyk, Jr.	1
(United States) Robertson Racing	Panoz Esperante GT-LM	Ford (Elan) 5.0 L V8	D	53	(United States) David Murry	10–12
(United States) Team Trans Sport Racing	Porsche 997 GT3-RSR	Porsche M97/77 3.8 L Flat-6	Y	54	(United States) Tim Pappas	1–8, 10–12
(United States) Team Trans Sport Racing	Porsche 997 GT3-RSR	Porsche M97/77 3.8 L Flat-6	Y	54	(United States) Terry Borcheller	1–8, 10–12
(United States) Team Trans Sport Racing	Porsche 997 GT3-RSR	Porsche M97/77 3.8 L Flat-6	Y	54	(Germany) Marc Basseng	1, 11
(United States) Risi Competizione	Ferrari F430 GTC	Ferrari F136 4.0 L V8	M	61	(Sweden) Niclas Jönsson	1–6, 11–12
(United States) Risi Competizione	Ferrari F430 GTC	Ferrari F136 4.0 L V8	M	61	(United States) Tracy Krohn	1, 4, 11–12
(United States) Risi Competizione	Ferrari F430 GTC	Ferrari F136 4.0 L V8	M	61	(United States) Colin Braun	1
(United States) Risi Competizione	Ferrari F430 GTC	Ferrari F136 4.0 L V8	M	61	(Argentina) José María López	2
(United States) Risi Competizione	Ferrari F430 GTC	Ferrari F136 4.0 L V8	M	61	(United States) Anthony Lazzaro	3
(United States) Risi Competizione	Ferrari F430 GTC	Ferrari F136 4.0 L V8	M	61	(France) Éric Hélary	5–10
(United States) Risi Competizione	Ferrari F430 GTC	Ferrari F136 4.0 L V8	M	61	(Italy) Gianmaria Bruni	7–10
(United States) Risi Competizione	Ferrari F430 GTC	Ferrari F136 4.0 L V8	M	61	(United Kingdom) Darren Turner	11
(United States) Risi Competizione	Ferrari F430 GTC	Ferrari F136 4.0 L V8	M	62	(Brazil) Jaime Melo	All
(United States) Risi Competizione	Ferrari F430 GTC	Ferrari F136 4.0 L V8	M	62	(Finland) Mika Salo	All
(United States) Risi Competizione	Ferrari F430 GTC	Ferrari F136 4.0 L V8	M	62	(United Kingdom) Johnny Mowlem	1, 11
(United States) Tafel Racing	Porsche 997 GT3-RSR	Porsche M97/77 3.8 L Flat-6	M	71	(Germany) Wolf Henzler	All
(United States) Tafel Racing	Porsche 997 GT3-RSR	Porsche M97/77 3.8 L Flat-6	M	71	(United Kingdom) Robin Liddell	1–10
(United States) Tafel Racing	Porsche 997 GT3-RSR	Porsche M97/77 3.8 L Flat-6	M	71	(United States) Patrick Long	1
(United States) Tafel Racing	Porsche 997 GT3-RSR	Porsche M97/77 3.8 L Flat-6	M	71	(Germany) Dominik Farnbacher	11–12
(United States) Tafel Racing	Porsche 997 GT3-RSR	Porsche M97/77 3.8 L Flat-6	M	73	(United States) Jim Tafel	All
(United States) Tafel Racing	Porsche 997 GT3-RSR	Porsche M97/77 3.8 L Flat-6	M	73	(Germany) Dominik Farnbacher	1–10
(United States) Tafel Racing	Porsche 997 GT3-RSR	Porsche M97/77 3.8 L Flat-6	M	73	(United Kingdom) Ian James	1
(United States) Tafel Racing	Porsche 997 GT3-RSR	Porsche M97/77 3.8 L Flat-6	M	73	(United States) Nathan Swartzbaugh	8, 11–12
(United States) Tafel Racing	Porsche 997 GT3-RSR	Porsche M97/77 3.8 L Flat-6	M	73	(Denmark) Lars-Erik Nielsen	11–12
(Slovakia) Autoracing Club Bratislava	Porsche 996 GT3-R	Porsche M96/79 3.6 L Flat-6	D	77	(Slovakia) Miro Konôpka	1
(Slovakia) Autoracing Club Bratislava	Porsche 996 GT3-R	Porsche M96/79 3.6 L Flat-6	D	77	(Italy) Mauro Casadei	1
(Slovakia) Autoracing Club Bratislava	Porsche 996 GT3-R	Porsche M96/79 3.6 L Flat-6	D	77	(United Kingdom) Bo McCormick	1
(Germany) Farnbacher Loles Racing	Porsche 997 GT3-RSR	Porsche M97/77 3.8 L Flat-6	Y	85	(Germany) Dirk Werner	1
(Germany) Farnbacher Loles Racing	Porsche 997 GT3-RSR	Porsche M97/77 3.8 L Flat-6	Y	85	(Germany) Pierre Ehret	1
(Germany) Farnbacher Loles Racing	Porsche 997 GT3-RSR	Porsche M97/77 3.8 L Flat-6	Y	85	(Denmark) Lars-Erik Nielsen	1
(Netherlands) Spyker Squadron	Spyker C8 Spyder GT2-R	Audi 3.8 L V8	M	86	(Netherlands) Peter Kox	1
(Netherlands) Spyker Squadron	Spyker C8 Spyder GT2-R	Audi 3.8 L V8	M	86	(Czech Republic) Jaroslav Janiš	1

* Was on the entry list but did not participate in the event.

== Season results ==
Overall winner in bold.

Rnd	Circuit	LMP1 Winning Team	LMP2 Winning Team	GT1 Winning Team	GT2 Winning Team	Results
Rnd	Circuit	LMP1 Winning Drivers	LMP2 Winning Drivers	GT1 Winning Drivers	GT2 Winning Drivers	Results
1	Sebring	**(United States) #2 Audi Sport North America**	(United States) #26 Andretti Green Racing	(United States) #4 Corvette Racing	(United States) #62 Risi Competizione	Results
1	Sebring	**(Germany) Marco Werner** **(Italy) Emanuele Pirro** **(Germany) Frank Biela**	(United States) Bryan Herta (United Kingdom) Dario Franchitti (Brazil) Tony Kanaan	(United Kingdom) Oliver Gavin (Monaco) Olivier Beretta (Italy) Max Papis	(Finland) Mika Salo (Brazil) Jaime Melo (United Kingdom) Johnny Mowlem	Results
2	St. Petersburg	**(United States) #1 Audi Sport North America**	(United States) #6 Penske Racing	(United States) #4 Corvette Racing	(United States) #62 Risi Competizione	Results
2	St. Petersburg	**(Italy) Rinaldo Capello** **(United Kingdom) Allan McNish**	(Germany) Sascha Maassen (Australia) Ryan Briscoe	(United Kingdom) Oliver Gavin (Monaco) Olivier Beretta	(Finland) Mika Salo (Brazil) Jaime Melo	Results
3	Long Beach	(United States) #1 Audi Sport North America	**(United States) #7 Penske Racing**	(United States) #4 Corvette Racing	(United States) #62 Risi Competizione	Results
3	Long Beach	(United Kingdom) Allan McNish (Italy) Rinaldo Capello	**(France) Romain Dumas** **(Germany) Timo Bernhard**	(United Kingdom) Oliver Gavin (Monaco) Olivier Beretta	(Finland) Mika Salo (Brazil) Jaime Melo	Results
4	Reliant Park	(United States) #1 Audi Sport North America	**(United States) #7 Penske Racing**	(United States) #3 Corvette Racing	(United States) #62 Risi Competizione	Results
4	Reliant Park	(United Kingdom) Allan McNish (Italy) Rinaldo Capello	**(France) Romain Dumas** **(Germany) Timo Bernhard**	(United States) Johnny O'Connell (Denmark) Jan Magnussen	(Finland) Mika Salo (Brazil) Jaime Melo	Results
5	Miller	(United States) #1 Audi Sport North America	**(United States) #6 Penske Racing**	(United States) #4 Corvette Racing	(United States) #31 Petersen/White Lightning	Results
5	Miller	(United Kingdom) Allan McNish (Italy) Rinaldo Capello	**(Germany) Sascha Maassen** **(Australia) Ryan Briscoe**	(United Kingdom) Oliver Gavin (Monaco) Olivier Beretta	(Czech Republic) Tomáš Enge (United Kingdom) Darren Turner	Results
6	Lime Rock	(United States) #1 Audi Sport North America	**(United States) #6 Penske Racing**	(United States) #4 Corvette Racing	(United States) #45 Flying Lizard Motorsports	Results
6	Lime Rock	(United Kingdom) Allan McNish (Italy) Rinaldo Capello	**(Germany) Sascha Maassen** **(Australia) Ryan Briscoe**	(United Kingdom) Oliver Gavin (Monaco) Olivier Beretta	(United States) Johannes van Overbeek (Germany) Jörg Bergmeister	Results
7	Mid-Ohio	(United States) #2 Audi Sport North America	**(United States) #7 Penske Racing**	(United States) #4 Corvette Racing	(United States) #45 Flying Lizard Motorsports	Results
7	Mid-Ohio	(Italy) Emanuele Pirro (Germany) Marco Werner	**(Germany) Timo Bernhard** **(France) Romain Dumas**	(United Kingdom) Oliver Gavin (Monaco) Olivier Beretta	(United States) Johannes van Overbeek (Germany) Jörg Bergmeister	Results
8	Road America	(United States) #1 Audi Sport North America	**(United States) #7 Penske Racing**	(United States) #4 Corvette Racing	(United States) #62 Risi Competizione	Results
8	Road America	(United Kingdom) Allan McNish (Italy) Rinaldo Capello	**(Germany) Timo Bernhard** **(France) Romain Dumas**	(United Kingdom) Oliver Gavin (Monaco) Olivier Beretta	(Finland) Mika Salo (Brazil) Jaime Melo	Results
9	Mosport Park	(United States) #1 Audi Sport North America	**(United States) #7 Penske Racing**	(United States) #3 Corvette Racing	(United States) #62 Risi Competizione	Results
9	Mosport Park	(United Kingdom) Allan McNish (Italy) Rinaldo Capello	**(Germany) Timo Bernhard** **(France) Romain Dumas**	(United States) Johnny O'Connell (Denmark) Jan Magnussen	(Finland) Mika Salo (Brazil) Jaime Melo	Results
10	Belle Isle	(United States) #2 Audi Sport North America	**(United States) #7 Penske Racing**	(United States) #3 Corvette Racing	(United States) #62 Risi Competizione	Results
10	Belle Isle	(Italy) Emanuele Pirro (Germany) Marco Werner	**(Germany) Timo Bernhard** **(France) Romain Dumas**	(United States) Johnny O'Connell (Denmark) Jan Magnussen	(Finland) Mika Salo (Brazil) Jaime Melo	Results
11	Road Atlanta	**(United States) #1 Audi Sport North America**	(United States) #7 Penske Racing	(United States) #4 Corvette Racing	(United States) #45 Flying Lizard Motorsports	Results
11	Road Atlanta	**(United Kingdom) Allan McNish** **(Italy) Rinaldo Capello**	(Germany) Timo Bernhard (France) Romain Dumas (United States) Patrick Long	(United Kingdom) Oliver Gavin (Monaco) Olivier Beretta (Italy) Max Papis	(United States) Johannes van Overbeek (Germany) Jörg Bergmeister (Germany) Marc Lieb	Results
12	Laguna Seca	**(United States) #1 Audi Sport North America**	(United States) #7 Penske Racing	(United States) #4 Corvette Racing	(United States) #62 Risi Competizione	Results
12	Laguna Seca	**(United Kingdom) Allan McNish** **(Italy) Rinaldo Capello**	(Germany) Timo Bernhard (France) Romain Dumas	(United Kingdom) Oliver Gavin (Monaco) Olivier Beretta	(Finland) Mika Salo (Brazil) Jaime Melo	Results

== Championship results ==
For most races, points are awarded to the top 10 finishers in the following order:

- 20-16-13-10-8-6-4-3-2-1

For the four hour Road America 500 and Monterey Sports Car Championships are scored in the following order:

- 23-19-16-13-11-9-7-6-5-4

And for the 12 Hours of Sebring and Petit Le Mans which award the top 10 finishers in the following order:

- 26-22-19-16-14-12-10-9-8-7

Cars failing to complete 70% of the winner's distance are not awarded points. Drivers failing to drive for at least 45 minutes in the race are not awarded points, with the exception of the Long Beach round where drivers need only 30 minutes minimum.

=== LMP1 Drivers' Championship ===
Pos.	Driver	Team	SEB (United States)	STP (United States)	LBH (United States)	HOU (United States)	UTA (United States)	LIM (United States)	MOH (United States)	ROA (United States)	MOS (Canada)	BEL (United States)	ATL (United States)	LAG (United States)	Pts.
1	(Italy) Rinaldo Capello	(United States) Audi Sport North America	2	1	1	1	1	1	2	1	1	2	1	1	246
1	(United Kingdom) Allan McNish	(United States) Audi Sport North America	2	1	1	1	1	1	2	1	1	2	1	1	246
2	(Germany) Marco Werner	(United States) Audi Sport North America	1	2	2	2	2	4	1	2	2	1	4	2	210
3	(Italy) Emanuele Pirro	(United States) Audi Sport North America	1	2	2	2	2	4	1	2	2	1	WD		175
4	(United States) Clint Field	(United States) Intersport Racing	3	3	3	3	3	2	5	Ret	Ret	Ret	Ret	Ret	95
5	(United States) Chris McMurry	(United States) Autocon Motorsports	4	Ret	4			3	4	4	3		5	Ret	89
6	(United States) Jon Field	(United States) Intersport Racing	3	3	3	3*	3	2	5	Ret	Ret	Ret	Ret	Ret	82
7	(United States) Michael Lewis	(United States) Autocon Motorsports	4	Ret	4		4	3		4			5		76
8	(United States) Greg Pickett	(United States) Team Cytosport			DNS				3	3		3	3	5	72
8	(Germany) Klaus Graf	(United States) Team Cytosport			DNS				3	3		3	3	5	72
9	(United States) Bryan Willman	(United States) Autocon Motorsports	4	Ret			4		4	4			5	Ret	63
10	(United States) Richard Berry	(United States) Intersport Racing	3	3		3*	3	2		Ret		Ret	Ret	Ret	61
11	(United Kingdom) Jamie Campbell-Walter	(United Kingdom) Creation Autosportif											2	3	38
11	(Switzerland) Harold Primat	(United Kingdom) Creation Autosportif											2	3	38
12	(Germany) Frank Biela	(United States) Audi Sport North America	1												26
13	(United Kingdom) Tom Chilton	(United Kingdom) Arena International Motorsport											6	4	25
13	(United Kingdom) Darren Manning	(United Kingdom) Arena International Motorsport											6	4	25
14	(Denmark) Tom Kristensen	(United States) Audi Sport North America	2												22
14	(France) Christophe Tinseau	(United Kingdom) Creation Autosportif											2		22
15	(Mexico) Memo Gidley	(United States) Team Cytosport											3		19
15	(Germany) Mike Rockenfeller	(United States) Audi Sport North America												2	19
16	(Germany) Lucas Luhr	(United States) Audi Sport North America											4		16
17	(Canada) Tony Burgess	(United States) Autocon Motorsports									3			Ret	13
Pos.	Driver	Team	SEB (United States)	STP (United States)	LBH (United States)	HOU (United States)	UTA (United States)	LIM (United States)	MOH (United States)	ROA (United States)	MOS (Canada)	BEL (United States)	ATL (United States)	LAG (United States)	Pts.

=== LMP1 Teams Championship ===
Teams only scored points for their highest finishing entry in each race.

Pos.	Team	No.	SEB (United States)	STP (United States)	LBH (United States)	HOU (United States)	UTA (United States)	LIM (United States)	MOH (United States)	ROA (United States)	MOS (Canada)	BEL (United States)	ATL (United States)	LAG (United States)	Pts.
1	(United States) Audi Sport North America	1	2	1	1	1	1	1	2	1	1	2	1	1	258
1	(United States) Audi Sport North America	2	1	2	2	2	2	4	1	2	2	1	4	2	258
2	(United States) Autocon Motorsports	12	4	Ret	4		4	3	4	4	3		5	Ret	99
3	(United States) Intersport Racing	37	3	3	3	3	3	2	5	Ret	Ret	Ret	Ret	Ret	95
4	(United States) Team Cytosport	06			DNS				3	3		3	3	5	72
NC	(United Kingdom) Creation Autosportif	88											2	3	0 (38)
NC	(United Kingdom) Arena International Motorsport	10											6	4	0 (25)
Pos.	Team	No.	SEB (United States)	STP (United States)	LBH (United States)	HOU (United States)	UTA (United States)	LIM (United States)	MOH (United States)	ROA (United States)	MOS (Canada)	BEL (United States)	ATL (United States)	LAG (United States)	Pts.

=== LMP2 Drivers' Championship ===
Pos.	Driver	Team	SEB (United States)	STP (United States)	LBH (United States)	HOU (United States)	UTA (United States)	LIM (United States)	MOH (United States)	ROA (United States)	MOS (Canada)	BEL (United States)	ATL (United States)	LAG (United States)	Pts.
1	(France) Romain Dumas	(United States) DHL Penske Racing	3	2	1	1	2	2	1	1	1	1	1	1	239
1	(Germany) Timo Bernhard	(United States) DHL Penske Racing	3	2	1	1	2	2	1	1	1	1	1	1	239
2	(Germany) Sascha Maassen	(United States) DHL Penske Racing	8	1	2	3	1	1	2	2	2	7	5	2	186
2	(Australia) Ryan Briscoe	(United States) DHL Penske Racing	8	1	2	3	1	1	2	2	2	7	5	2	186
3	(United Kingdom) Andy Wallace	(United States) Dyson Racing Team	5	5	3	6	3	5	4	5	7	2	4	6	128
3	(United States) Butch Leitzinger	(United States) Dyson Racing Team	5	5	3	6	3	5	4	5	7	2	4	6	128
4	(United States) Chris Dyson	(United States) Dyson Racing Team	6	6	5	5	4	4	5	4	5	5	2	5	124
4	(United Kingdom) Guy Smith	(United States) Dyson Racing Team	6	6	5	5	4	4	5	4	5	5	2	5	124
5	(Australia) David Brabham	(United States) Highcroft Racing	4	3	4	4	6	3	6	3	Ret	3	6	Ret	115
5	(Sweden) Stefan Johansson	(United States) Highcroft Racing	4	3	4	4	6	3	6	3	Ret	3	6	Ret	115
6	(Mexico) Adrian Fernandez	(Mexico) Lowe's Fernández Racing	2	4	7	7	5	Ret	3	6	6	4	Ret	3	102
6	(Mexico) Luis Diaz	(Mexico) Lowe's Fernández Racing	2	4	7	7	5	Ret	3	6	6	4	Ret	3	102
7	(United States) Bryan Herta	(United States) Andretti Green Racing	1	7	6	2	Ret	6	7	7	3	8	Ret	4	98
8	(United Kingdom) Marino Franchitti	(United States) Andretti Green Racing		7		2	Ret	6	7	7	3	8			53
9	(United Kingdom) Ben Devlin	(United States) B-K Motorsports	NC	Ret	8	8	Ret	8	Ret	8	4	6	7	7	48
9	(United States) James Bach	(United States) B-K Motorsports	NC	Ret	8	8	Ret	8	Ret	8	4	6	7	7	48
10	(Brazil) Tony Kanaan	(United States) Andretti Green Racing	1										Ret	4	39
11	(United Kingdom) Dario Franchitti	(United States) Andretti Green Racing	1		6										32
12	(United States) Andy Lally	(United States) Dyson Racing Team	5										4		30
13	(United States) Patrick Long	(United States) DHL Penske Racing											1		26
14	(Germany) Stefan Mücke	(United Kingdom) Zytek Motorsports											3	8	25
15	(France) Emmanuel Collard	(United States) DHL Penske Racing	8										5		23
16	(Brazil) Hélio Castroneves	(United States) DHL Penske Racing	3												19
16	(United Kingdom) Danny Watts	(United Kingdom) Zytek Motorsports											3		19
16	(Czech Republic) Jan Charouz	(United Kingdom) Zytek Motorsports											3		19
17	(United States) Duncan Dayton	(United States) Highcroft Racing	4												19
18	(United Kingdom) Robbie Kerr	(United States) Highcroft Racing											6	Ret	12
19	(Switzerland) Fredy Lienhard	(Switzerland) Horag Racing	7												10
19	(Belgium) Didier Theys	(Switzerland) Horag Racing	7												10
19	(Belgium) Eric van de Poele	(Switzerland) Horag Racing	7												10
19	(Brazil) Raphael Matos	(United States) B-K Motorsports	NC	Ret									7		10
20	(United States) Adam Pecorari	(United States) Van der Steur Racing						7	8		Ret				7
20	(United States) Gunnar van der Steur	(United States) Van der Steur Racing						7	8		Ret				7
21	(Japan) Hayanari Shimoda	(United Kingdom) Zytek Motorsports												8	6
-	(Brazil) Vítor Meira	(United States) Andretti Green Racing											Ret		0
Pos.	Driver	Team	SEB (United States)	STP (United States)	LBH (United States)	HOU (United States)	UTA (United States)	LIM (United States)	MOH (United States)	ROA (United States)	MOS (Canada)	BEL (United States)	ATL (United States)	LAG (United States)	Pts.

=== LMP2 Teams Championship ===
Teams only scored points for their highest finishing entry in each race.

Pos.	Team	No.	SEB (United States)	STP (United States)	LBH (United States)	HOU (United States)	UTA (United States)	LIM (United States)	MOH (United States)	ROA (United States)	MOS (Canada)	BEL (United States)	ATL (United States)	LAG (United States)	Pts.
1	(United States) DHL Penske Racing	6	8	1	2	3	1	1	2	2	2	7	5	2	251
1	(United States) DHL Penske Racing	7	3	2	1	1	2	2	1	1	1	1	1	1	251
2	(United States) Dyson Racing Team	16	5	5	3	6	3	5	4	5	7	2	4	6	146
2	(United States) Dyson Racing Team	20	6	6	5	5	4	4	5	4	5	5	2	5	146
3	(United States) Highcroft Racing	9	4	3	4	4	6	3	6	3	Ret	3	6	Ret	115
4	(Mexico) Lowe's Fernández Racing	15	2	4	7	7	5	Ret	3	6	6	4	Ret	3	102
5	(United States) Andretti Green Racing	26	1	7	6	2	Ret	6	7	7	3	8	Ret	4	98
6	(United States) B-K Motorsports	8	NC	Ret	8	8	Ret	8	Ret	8	4	6	7	7	48
7	(United States) Van der Steur Racing	19						7	8		Ret				7
NC	(United Kingdom) Zytek Motorsports	5											3	8	0 (25)
NC	(Switzerland) Horag Racing	27	7												0 (10)
Pos.	Team	No.	SEB (United States)	STP (United States)	LBH (United States)	HOU (United States)	UTA (United States)	LIM (United States)	MOH (United States)	ROA (United States)	MOS (Canada)	BEL (United States)	ATL (United States)	LAG (United States)	Pts.

=== GT1 Drivers' Championship ===
Pos.	Driver	Team	SEB (United States)	STP (United States)	LBH (United States)	HOU (United States)	UTA (United States)	LIM (United States)	MOH (United States)	ROA (United States)	MOS (Canada)	BEL (United States)	ATL (United States)	LAG (United States)	Pts.
1	(United Kingdom) Oliver Gavin	(United States) Corvette Racing	1	1	1	2	1	1	1	1	2	2	1	1	246
1	(Monaco) Olivier Beretta	(United States) Corvette Racing	1	1	1	2	1	1	1	1	2	2	1	1	246
2	(Denmark) Jan Magnussen	(United States) Corvette Racing	2	Ret	2	1	2	2	2	2	1	1	Ret	2	184
2	(United States) Johnny O'Connell	(United States) Corvette Racing	2	Ret	2	1	2	2	2	2	1	1	Ret	2	184
3	(Italy) Max Papis	(United States) Corvette Racing	1										1		52
4	(Switzerland) Fredy Lienhard	(United States) Doran Racing								3			2		38
4	(Belgium) Didier Theys	(United States) Doran Racing								3			2		38
5	(Canada) Ron Fellows	(United States) Corvette Racing	2										Ret		35
5	(Canada) Ron Fellows	(United States) Pratt & Miller									3				35
6	(Italy) Andrea Bertolini	(United States) Doran Racing											2		22
7	(Spain) Antonio García	(United Kingdom) Team Modena	3												19
7	(United States) Liz Halliday	(United Kingdom) Team Modena	3												19
7	(United Kingdom) Darren Turner	(United Kingdom) Team Modena	3												19
8	(United States) Andy Pilgrim	(United States) Pratt & Miller									3				13
Pos.	Driver	Team	SEB (United States)	STP (United States)	LBH (United States)	HOU (United States)	UTA (United States)	LIM (United States)	MOH (United States)	ROA (United States)	MOS (Canada)	BEL (United States)	ATL (United States)	LAG (United States)	Pts.

=== GT1 Teams Championship ===
Teams only scored points for their highest finishing entry in each race.

Pos.	Team	No.	SEB (United States)	STP (United States)	LBH (United States)	HOU (United States)	UTA (United States)	LIM (United States)	MOH (United States)	ROA (United States)	MOS (Canada)	BEL (United States)	ATL (United States)	LAG (United States)	Pts.
1	(United States) Corvette Racing	3	2	Ret	2	1	2	2	2	2	1	1	Ret	2	253
1	(United States) Corvette Racing	4	1	1	1	2	1	1	1	1	2	2	1	1	253
NC	(United States) Doran Racing	27								3			2		0 (38)
NC	(United Kingdom) Team Modena	63	3												0 (19)
NC	(United States) Pratt & Miller	33									3				0 (13)
Pos.	Team	No.	SEB (United States)	STP (United States)	LBH (United States)	HOU (United States)	UTA (United States)	LIM (United States)	MOH (United States)	ROA (United States)	MOS (Canada)	BEL (United States)	ATL (United States)	LAG (United States)	Pts.

=== GT2 Drivers' Championship ===
Pos.	Driver	Team	SEB (United States)	STP (United States)	LBH (United States)	HOU (United States)	UTA (United States)	LIM (United States)	MOH (United States)	ROA (United States)	MOS (Canada)	BEL (United States)	ATL (United States)	LAG (United States)	Pts.
1	(Finland) Mika Salo	(United States) Risi Competizione	1	1	1	1	Ret	9	2	1	1	1	6	1	202
1	(Brazil) Jaime Melo	(United States) Risi Competizione	1	1	1	1	Ret	9	2	1	1	1	6	1	202
2	(Germany) Jörg Bergmeister	(United States) Flying Lizard Motorsports	2	2	9	2	2	1	1	5	5	Ret	1	4	170
2	(United States) Johannes van Overbeek	(United States) Flying Lizard Motorsports	2	2	9	2	2	1	1	5	5	Ret	1	4	170
3	(Germany) Wolf Henzler	(United States) Tafel Racing	3	5	4	3	3	NC	Ret	3	6	Ret	2	2	126
4	(United States) Tommy Milner	(United States) Rahal Letterman Racing	6	8	Ret	8	6	2	NC	2	3	Ret	3	3	107
4	(Germany) Ralf Kelleners	(United States) Rahal Letterman Racing	6	8	Ret	8	6	2	NC	2	3	Ret	3	3	107
5	(Germany) Dominik Farnbacher	(United States) Tafel Racing	5	6	7	Ret	8	6	Ret	8	8	5	2	2	91
6	(United States) Darren Law	(United States) Flying Lizard Motorsports	13	4	2	5		4		9		2	5	7	86
7	(United Kingdom) Robin Liddell	(United States) Tafel Racing	3	5	4	3	3	NC	Ret	3	6	Ret			85
8	(France) Éric Hélary	(United States) Risi Competizione					4	3	3	6	2	4			71
9	(United States) Tim Pappas	(United States) Team Trans Sport Racing	Ret	7	8	6	9	5	6	7		6	4	5	69
9	(United States) Terry Borcheller	(United States) Team Trans Sport Racing	Ret	7	8	6	9	5	6	7		6	4	5	69
10	(United States) Seth Neiman	(United States) Flying Lizard Motorsports	13			5	7	4	4	9	7		5	7	62
11	(Germany) Dirk Müller	(United States) Petersen White Lightning			6	4			5	4	4	3	Ret		60
12	(Sweden) Niclas Jönsson	(United States) Risi Competizione	9	DNS	3	Ret	4	3					8	8	59
13	(United States) Patrick Long	(United States) Tafel Racing	3												51
13	(United States) Patrick Long	(United States) Flying Lizard Motorsports			2							2			51
14	(United States) Jim Tafel	(United States) Tafel Racing	5	6	7	Ret	8	6	Ret	8	8	5	Ret	11	50
15	(United States) Lonnie Pechnik	(United States) Flying Lizard Motorsports	13	4			7		4		7		5	7	49
16	(Italy) Gianmaria Bruni	(United States) Risi Competizione							3	6	2	4			48
16	(Germany) Marc Lieb	(United States) Flying Lizard Motorsports	2										1		48
17	(United States) Bill Auberlen	(United States) Panoz Team PTG	11	3	5	Ret	Ret	8	Ret	10	Ret	NC	7	6	47
17	(United States) Joey Hand	(United States) Panoz Team PTG	11	3	5	Ret	Ret	8	Ret	10	Ret	NC	7	6	47
18	(Czech Republic) Tomáš Enge	(United States) Petersen White Lightning	8	10			1	7	5						42
19	(United Kingdom) Johnny Mowlem	(United States) Risi Competizione	1										6		38
20	(United Kingdom) Peter Dumbreck	(United States) Petersen White Lightning								4	4	3	Ret	Ret	36
21	(United Kingdom) Darren Turner	(United States) Petersen White Lightning					1	7							33
21	(United Kingdom) Darren Turner	(United States) Risi Competizione											8		33
22	(United States) Graham Rahal	(United States) Rahal Letterman Racing	6										3		31
23	(United States) Tracy Krohn	(United States) Risi Competizione	9			Ret							8	8	23
24	(Czech Republic) Jaroslav Janiš	(Netherlands) Spyker Squadron	10												17
24	(Czech Republic) Jaroslav Janiš	(United States) Petersen White Lightning				4									17
25	(Denmark) Lars-Erik Nielsen	(Germany) Farnbacher Loles Racing	4												16
25	(Denmark) Lars-Erik Nielsen	(United States) Tafel Racing											Ret	11	16
25	(Germany) Pierre Ehret	(Germany) Farnbacher Loles Racing	4												16
25	(Germany) Dirk Werner	(Germany) Farnbacher Loles Racing	4												16
25	(Germany) Tim Bergmeister	(United States) Petersen White Lightning	8	10	6										16
25	(Germany) Marc Basseng	(United States) Team Trans Sport Racing	Ret										4		16
26	(United Kingdom) Ian James	(United States) Tafel Racing	5												14
27	(United States) Anthony Lazzaro	(United States) Risi Competizione			3										13
28	(United Kingdom) Ben Aucott	(Monaco) JMB Racing	7												10
28	(United Kingdom) Joe Macari	(Monaco) JMB Racing	7												10
28	(New Zealand) Rob Wilson	(Monaco) JMB Racing	7												10
28	(United Kingdom) Tom Kimber-Smith	(United States) Panoz Team PTG	11										7		10
29	(United States) Colin Braun	(United States) Risi Competizione	9												8
29	(Italy) Maurizio Mediani	(United States) Corsa/White Lightning	Ret												8
29	(Italy) Maurizio Mediani	(United States) Corsa Motorsports					5								8
29	(Portugal) Rui Águas	(United States) Corsa/White Lightning	Ret												8
29	(Portugal) Rui Águas	(United States) Corsa Motorsports					5								8
30	(Netherlands) Peter Kox	(Netherlands) Spyker Squadron	10												7
31	(United States) Ross Smith	(United States) Panoz Team PTG	12	9	Ret	7	Ret								6
31	(Canada) Scott Maxwell	(United States) Panoz Team PTG	12	9	Ret	7	Ret								6
31	(United States) Nathan Swartzbaugh	(United States) Tafel Racing								8			Ret	11	6
32	(United States) Joel Feinberg	(United States) Primetime Race Group										NC	Ret	9	5
32	(United States) Chapman Ducote	(United States) Primetime Race Group										NC	Ret	9	5
33	(United States) Cindi Lux	(United States) Woodhouse Performance							7						4
33	(United States) Stan Wilson	(United States) Woodhouse Performance							7						4
33	(United States) David Robertson	(United States) Robertson Racing	Ret									Ret	Ret	10	4
33	(United States) Andrea Robertson	(United States) Robertson Racing	Ret									Ret	Ret	10	4
33	(United States) David Murry	(United States) Robertson Racing										Ret	Ret	10	4
-	(United States) Bryan Sellers	(United States) Panoz Team PTG	12												0
-	(Argentina) José María López	(United States) Corsa/White Lightning	Ret	DNS											0
-	(Italy) Luciano Da Silva	(Germany) Konrad Motorsport	Ret												0
-	(United States) Philip Collin	(Germany) Konrad Motorsport	Ret												0
-	(Brazil) Antônio Hermann	(Germany) Konrad Motorsport	Ret												0
-	(Slovakia) Miro Konôpka	(Slovakia) Autoracing Club Bratislava	Ret												0
-	(Italy) Mauro Casadei	(Slovakia) Autoracing Club Bratislava	Ret												0
-	(United Kingdom) Bo McCormick	(Slovakia) Autoracing Club Bratislava	Ret												0
-	(Netherlands) Arie Luyendyk, Jr.	(United States) Robertson Racing	Ret												0
-	(Germany) Lucas Luhr	(United States) Petersen White Lightning											WD	Ret	0
Pos.	Driver	Team	SEB (United States)	STP (United States)	LBH (United States)	HOU (United States)	UTA (United States)	LIM (United States)	MOH (United States)	ROA (United States)	MOS (Canada)	BEL (United States)	ATL (United States)	LAG (United States)	Pts.

=== GT2 Teams Championship ===
Teams only scored points for their highest finishing entry in each race.

Pos.	Team	No.	SEB (United States)	STP (United States)	LBH (United States)	HOU (United States)	UTA (United States)	LIM (United States)	MOH (United States)	ROA (United States)	MOS (Canada)	BEL (United States)	ATL (United States)	LAG (United States)	Pts.
1	(United States) Risi Competizione	61	9	DNS	3	Ret	4	3	3	6	2	4	8	8	223
1	(United States) Risi Competizione	62	1	1	1	1	Ret	9	2	1	1	1	6	1	223
2	(United States) Flying Lizard Motorsports	44	13	4	2	5	7	4	4	9	7	2	5	7	200
2	(United States) Flying Lizard Motorsports	45	2	2	9	2	2	1	1	5	5	Ret	1	4	200
3	(United States) Tafel Racing	71	3	5	4	3	3	NC	Ret	3	6	Ret	2	2	140
3	(United States) Tafel Racing	73	5	6	7	Ret	8	6	Ret	8	8	5	Ret	11	140
4	(United States) Rahal Letterman Racing	18	6	8	Ret	8	6	2	NC	2	3	Ret	3	3	107
5	(United States) Petersen White Lightning	31	8	10	6	4	1	7	5	4	4	3	Ret	Ret	94
6	(United States) Team Trans Sport Racing	54	Ret	7	8	6	9	5	6	7		6	4	5	69
7	(United States) Panoz Team PTG	21	11	3	5	Ret	Ret	8	Ret				7	6	51
7	(United States) Panoz Team PTG	22	12	9	Ret	7	Ret			10	Ret	NC			51
8	(United States) Robertson Racing	53	Ret									Ret	Ret	10	4
NC	(Germany) Farnbacher Loles Racing	85	4												0 (16)
NC	(Monaco) JMB Racing	24	7												0 (10)
NC	(United States) Corsa Motorsports	48					5								0 (8)
NC	(Netherlands) Spyker Squadron	86	10												0 (7)
NC	(United States) Primetime Race Group	11										NC	Ret	9	0 (5)
NC	(United States) Woodhouse Performance	13							7						0 (4)
NC	(Germany) Konrad Motorsport	10	Ret												0
NC	(United States) Corsa/White Lightning	32	Ret												0
NC	(Slovakia) Autoracing Club Bratislava	77	Ret												0
Pos.	Team	No.	SEB (United States)	STP (United States)	LBH (United States)	HOU (United States)	UTA (United States)	LIM (United States)	MOH (United States)	ROA (United States)	MOS (Canada)	BEL (United States)	ATL (United States)	LAG (United States)	Pts.

== Bibliography ==
- Kjos, Tom (2008). American Le Mans Series 2007 Season Yearbook. TPP Publishing Inc. ISBN 978-0981539003.
