= Asiana =

Asiana may refer to:

- Kumho Asiana Group, a South Korean conglomerate whose subsidiaries include the following notable companies also with the name Asiana:
  - Asiana Airlines, one of South Korea's two major airlines
  - Asiana IDT, an information technology service provider
- Asia (Roman province), a late Roman Republic province also known as Asiana
