= Hayanari =

- Gender: Male

Origin
- Origin: Japanese
- Meaning: Different meanings depending on the kanji used

Hayanari (written: 隼成 or 逸勢) is a masculine Japanese given name. Notable people with the name include:

- Hayanari Shimoda (下田 隼成; born 1984), Japanese racing driver
- Tachibana no Hayanari (橘 逸勢; 782–844), Japanese government official and calligrapher
