= Kumho Polychem =

Kumho Polychem's wordmark since 2006; Kumho Asiana Group's red "Wing" symbol was removed from the logo after the company (along with other sister companies of Kumho Petrochemical) was spun off into Kumho Petrochemical Group

Kumho Polychem is a part of South Korean conglomerate Kumho Petrochemical Group, operating a factory located in Yeosu Industrial Complex. It manufactures EPDM rubbers, TPVs and KEPA.

It was founded in 1985 and is currently the 3rd largest producer of EPDM in the world (220,000 tonnes per year).

The company currently supplies its products for various uses including automobiles, hoses, seals and wire insulation.

Also it developed thermoplastic rubber, Innoprene, which has the elasticity of thermosetting rubber and the compatibility of thermoplastic, based on our 20 years' experience in the production and research technology of EP rubber.

Current products' capacity: EP(D)M – 220,000 MT, TPV / KEPA 7,000 MT (as of January 1, 2016)
