= Sinmunno 1-ga =

Korean transcription(s)
  - Hangul: 신문로1가
  - Hanja: 新門路一街
  - Revised Romanization: Sinmunno il ga
  - McCune–Reischauer: Sinmunno il ka
- Interactive map of Sinmunno 1-ga
- Country: South Korea
- District: Jongno District

Area
  - Total: 0.07 km^{2} (0.027 sq mi)

Sinmunno 1-ga (Korean: 신문로1가) is a dong (neighbourhood) of Jongno District, Seoul, South Korea. It is a legal dong (법정동 法定洞) administered under its administrative dong (행정동 行政洞), Sajik-dong.

Kumho Asiana Group is headquartered at the Kumho Asiana Main Tower in Sinmunno 1-ga. This building has the head office of Air Seoul.

== Attraction ==
- Seoul Museum of History

== See also ==
- Administrative divisions of South Korea
