= Kumho Petrochemical =

South Korean multinational chemical company

Kumho Petrochemical Co., Ltd.
- Native name: 금호석유화학
- Type: Public company
- Traded as: KRX: 011780
- Industry: Chemicals industry
- Founded: 28 December 1970; 55 years ago
- Founder: Park In-chon
- Headquarters: Seoul, South Korea
- Area served: Worldwide
- Key people: Park Chan-koo (Chairman & CEO), Kim Seong-Chae (President & CEO)
- Products: Synthetic rubbers Synthetic resins Specialty chemicals
- Owner: Park Chan-koo
- Number of employees: 1,358 (2012)
- Subsidiaries: Kumho P&B Chemicals, Kumho Polychem, Kumho Mitsui Chemicals, Kumho Trading, Kumho T&L
- Website: kkpc.com

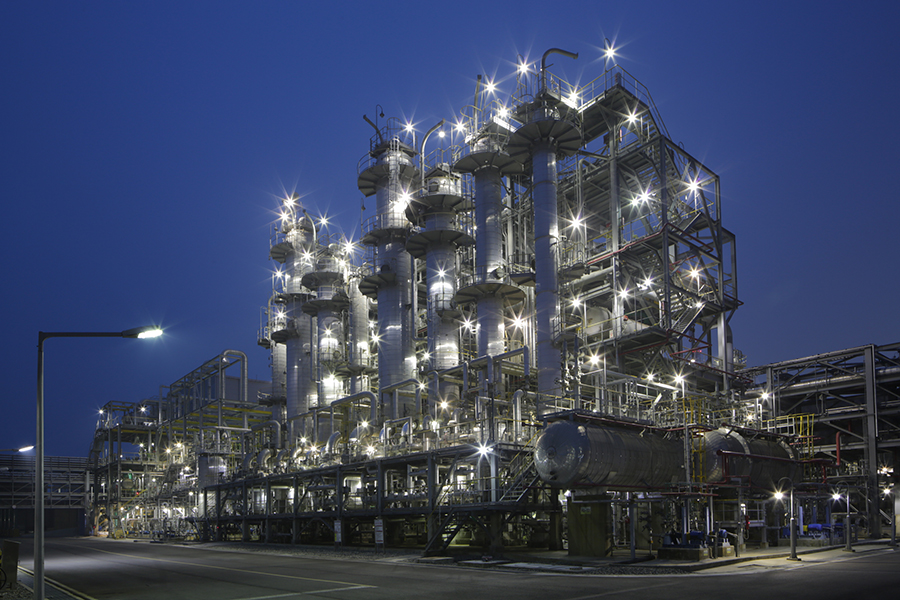
Yeosu Synthetic Rubber Plant II

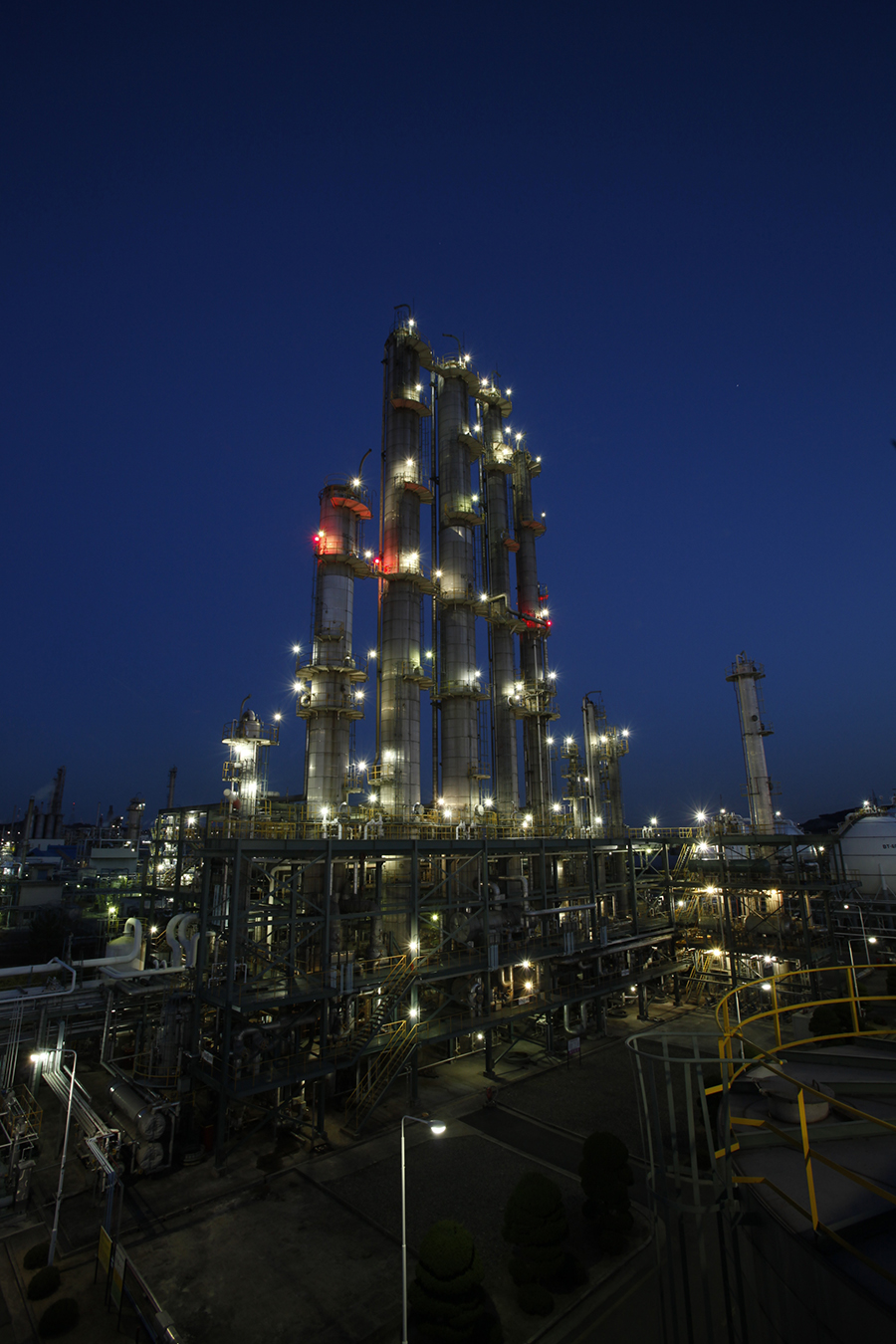
Ulsan Synthetic Rubber Plant

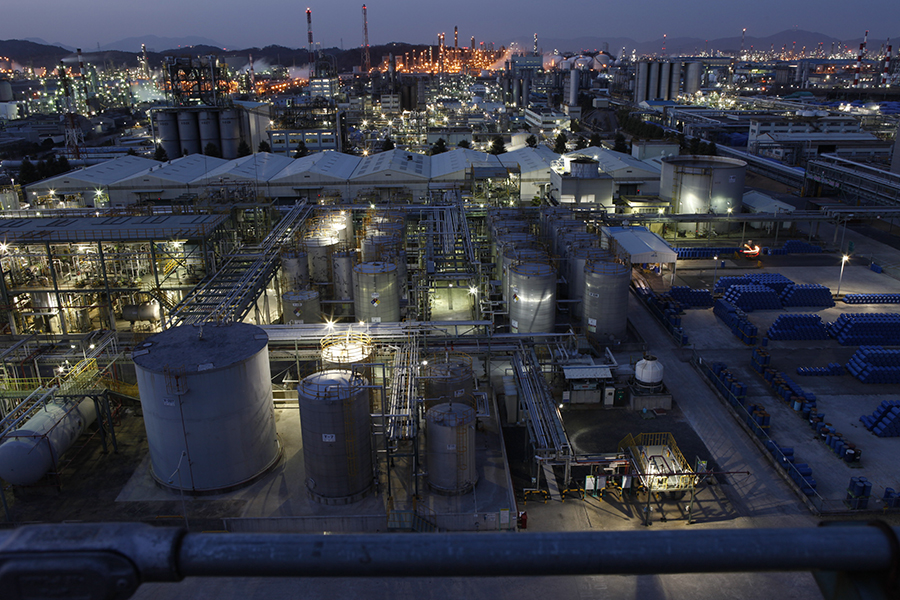
Ulsan Synthetic Resin Plant

Kumho Petrochemical Co. (KKPC) (Korean: 금호석유화학 주식회사) is a South Korean chemical company headquarters in Seoul. As of 2012, Kumho Petrochemical was the manufacturer of synthetic rubbers with the world's largest production capacity based on styrene-butadiene rubber (SBR) and butadiene rubber (BR) according to the International Institute of Synthetic Rubber Producers (IISRP).

The company focuses on synthetic rubbers, synthetic resins, specialty chemicals, electronic chemicals, energy, building materials and advanced materials as its core business.

== History ==
=== Foundation and early years ===
It was founded in 1970 when Kumho Group struggled to secure raw materials for its bus and tire businesses.

In 2011, Kumho Petrochemical was ranked at 1806th of 'the Global 2000' by Forbes. In 2013, it became a component of the KOSPI 100 index, which tracks 100 major companies listed on the Korea Stock Exchange.

It changed its name from 'Korea Kumho Petrochemical' to 'Kumho Petrochemical' effective 15 February 2012.

=== Management Issues 2012 ===
At the end of 2012, Kumho Petrochemical ended its restructuring program under creditors supervision successfully with its highest credit rating of 'A−' (Stable) by Korea Investors Service. It was the first success case since Kumho Asiana Group entered into a 'workout' program to pay down the debt at the end of 2009.

It resulted from its independent management from its parent 'Kumho Asiana Group,' based on the creditors' agreement which Park Chan-koo, fourth son of founder and chairman of Kumho Petrochemical, took responsibility for Kumho Petrochemical and its subsidiaries, and Park Sam-koo, third son and Kumho group chairman, for Kumho Tire since February 2010. Kumho Petrochemical is struggling to separate the company and its affiliates from Kumho Asiana Group.

=== Split and growth 2015-Present ===
It was spun off from Kumho Asiana Group in December 2015. The Kumho Petrochemical's logo which it had used since 2006 had the Kumho Asiana Group's red "Wing" symbol removed from the logo after the company and its sister companies were spun off into Kumho Petrochemical Group.

== Products ==
=== Synthetic Rubbers ===
Kumho Petrochemical's main business is synthetic rubbers. The company produces general synthetic rubbers such as BR (Butadiene Rubber) and SBR (Styrene-butadiene Rubber), with over 40 years of operation in this sector. Its customers include major international tire manufacturers. The company has also developed synthetic rubbers such as S-SBR (Solution Styrene Butadiene Rubber) and Nd-BR (Neodymium Polybutadiene Rubber), which meet EU tire label requirements.

=== Specialty Chemicals ===
Kumho Petrochemical has the world's second largest production capacity of 6PPD, antioxidant products for industrial rubbers. It has created synergy effects through vertical integration of synthetic rubbers and specialty chemicals businesses.

=== Synthetic resins ===
Synthetic resins are another biggest businesses of Kumho Petrochemical based on sales revenue. It delivers general and high-performance plastic materials such as PS (polystyrene), ABS (acrylonitrile butadiene styrene), EPS (expandable polystyrene), SAN (styrene acrylonitrile), PPG (polypropylene glycol), etc.

=== Others ===
Electronic chemicals, combined heat and power plants, carbon-nano-tube materials are other growing business of Kumho Petrochemical. It produces raw electronic materials for use in semiconductors and display components, and operates combined heat and power plants to provide energy to its own affiliates. It is venturing into the future high-tech carbon-nano-tube materials business.

== Affiliates ==
- Kumho P&B Chemicals provides BPA (bisphenol A), MIBK (methyl isobutyl ketone), epoxy resin, phenol, and acetone. In terms of production capacity, it is 5th BPA maker and 9th phenol maker in the world. (founded in 1976)
- Kumho Polychem provides EPDM (ethylene propylene diene monomer) with 4th largest production capacity in the world. (founded in 1985)
- Kumho Mitsui Chemicals provides MDI (methylene diphenyl diisocyanate). (founded in 1989)
- Kumho Trading (founded in 2000)
- Kumho T&L (founded in 2009)
