= Kumho Asiana Main Tower =

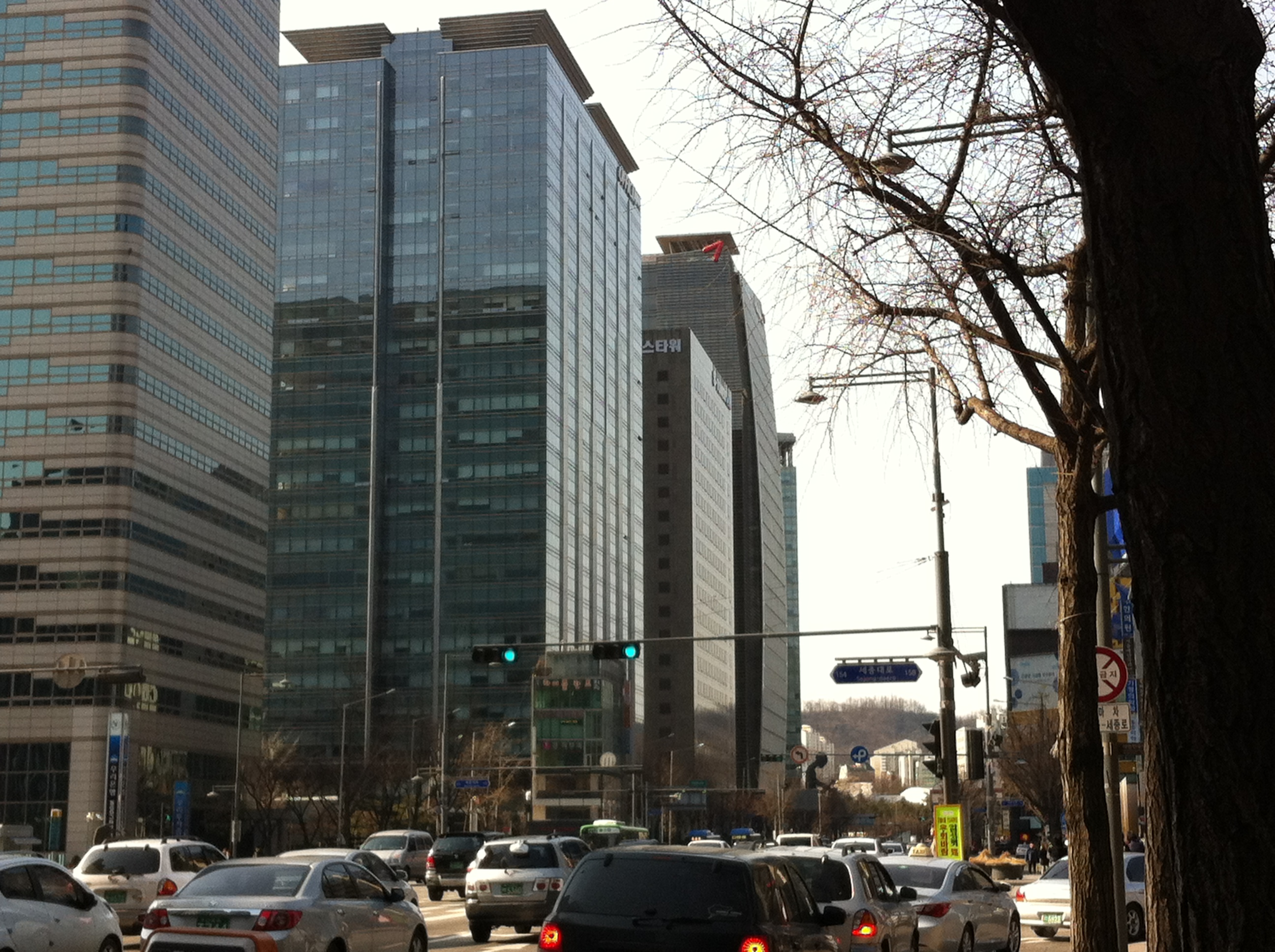
- Kumho Asiana Main Tower (in background with the red arrow logo)

General information
- Type: Office Building
- Location: Seoul, South Korea
- Completed: 2008
- Client: Kumho Asiana Group

Technical details
- Floor count: 29 Stories and 8 Basements
- Floor area: 60,695 sq. meters

Design and construction
- Architecture firm: Samoo Architects & Engineers, G.S Architects & Associates

Website
- Main Official Website

Kumho Asiana Main Tower (금호아시아나 본관) is the headquarters of the Kumho Asiana Group, a South Korean conglomerate.

The head office of Air Seoul is in the building.

== Architecture ==
Unlike the adjacent apartment and office buildings, the Kumho Asiana Main tower is curved. The designers said they were inspired by the image of an airplane in flight. Kumho Asiana is the parent company of Asiana Airlines. The glass and steel façade also sports a digital media board. The art façade is illuminated by 42,000 LED light bulbs to display different designs or works of art by commissioned artists.

== See also ==
- Kumho Asiana Group
- LED
- New media art
- Light pollution
