= Doublestar (company) =

South Korean tire manufacturer (subsidiary of Chinese Doublestar)

Doublestar Co, Ltd
- Industry: Automotive
- Founded: 1921; 105 years ago
- Headquarters: Qingdao, China
- Area served: Worldwide
- Products: Tires
- Subsidiaries: Kumho Tire (45% share; 2018–present)

Doublestar Co, Ltd (Chinese: 双星集团有限责任公司) is a Chinese tire company. Formed in 1921, it is listed on the Shenzhen Stock Exchange. Doublestar is also the largest shareholder of South Korean tire manufacturer Kumho Tire. In 2025, Doublestar ranked 93rd on China's 500 Most Valuable Brands list, compiled by World Brand Lab, with a brand value of 116.208 billion yuan.

== Operations ==
Doublestar was founded in 1921 as a shoe company. In 2001, Doublestar acquired Huaqing Tire, and in 2005 it acquired Dongfeng Tire. In 2008, its shoe and clothing businesses were divested from the group and switched to tire production. In July 2018, Doublestar purchased a 45% share of Kumho Tire from the Kumho Asiana Group.
