= Kumho Engineering and Construction =

- Industry: Civil engineering, construction
- Founded: 1967 as Jeil Ground and Construction
- Headquarters: South Korea, Seoul
- Website: www.kumhoenc.com/eng

- Kumho Engineering and Construction
- Hangul: 금호건설
- Hanja: 金湖建設
- RR: Geumho geonseol
- MR: Kŭmho kŏnsŏl

Kumho Engineering and Construction is a Korean civil engineering and construction company based in South Korea.

It is a corporate member of the Kumho Asiana Group.
