= Kumho Asiana Cultural Foundation =

South Korean music, art, and entertainment company

- Hangul: 금호아시아나문화재단
- Hanja: 錦湖韓亞文化財團
- Revised Romanization: Geumho Asi-ana Munhwa Jaedan
- McCune–Reischauer: Kŭmho Asiana Munhwa Chaetan

Kumho Asiana Cultural Foundation Co, Ltd. (Korean: 금호아시아나문화재단) is a music, art, and entertainment company. It is headquartered in Sinmunro-1-ga Jongno-gu, Seoul, Korea. Established in 1977, it is a wholly owned subsidiary of Kumho Asiana Group.

Kumho Asiana Cultural Foundation currently operates entertainment agencies in Korea, including locations in Kumho Art Hall, Kumho Art Museum, and is one of the largest entertainment agencies in the world.

== General ==
Established on 29 November 1977, Kumho Asiana Cultural Foundation started as a scholarship foundation. Later, as the Group adopted the philosophy that "a company must give back a portion of its profits to the people and region to whom it owes its existence", the Foundation extended its area of support to include classical music and the fine arts, in addition to education and scholarships.

With its aim to nurture talent and to promote culture, Kumho Asiana Cultural Foundation currently owns and operates Kumho Art Hall, a classical music hall specifically created for chamber music concerts, as well as Munho Art Hall and the Kumho Museum of Art. It carries out a wide range of activities, including the discovery and support of young talent in the fields of classical music and the fine arts, the organisation of concerts featuring distinguished musicians and orchestras from all over the world, the running of education programmes in art and culture, the free loan of rare musical instruments, and the provision of airline tickets and scholarships to gifted musicians. Through such significant contributions and wide-ranging support activities in the field of art and culture, Kumho Asiana Cultural Foundation has carved a position for itself as one of Korea's most prominent art patronage institutions.
