= Kumho Tire =

South Korean tire manufacturer

Kumho Tire Co., Inc.
- Logo used since 2023
- Type: Public
- Industry: Automotive, Aerospace
- Founded: 1960; 66 years ago (as Samyang Tire)
- Founder: Park In-chon
- Headquarters: Gwangju, South Korea
- Area served: Worldwide
- Key people: Jung Il-taek (President & CEO)
- Products: Tires
- Revenue: ▲ ₩4.7013 trillion (2025)
- Operating income: ▼ ₩575.5 billion (2025)
- Number of employees: 10,311

Korean name
- Hangul: 금호타이어
- Hanja: 錦湖타이어
- RR: Geumho taieo
- MR: Kŭmho t'aiŏ
- Website: http://www.kumhotire.com/

Kumho Tire's wordmark from 2006 to 2023; Kumho Asiana Group's red "Wing" symbol was removed from the logo after the company was sold to Doublestar

Kumho Tire (formerly known as Samyang Tire) is a South Korean tire manufacturer. Kumho Tire was previously operated as a business unit of the Kumho Asiana Group. Since 2018, its major shareholder has been Chinese tire conglomerate Doublestar.

== Operations ==
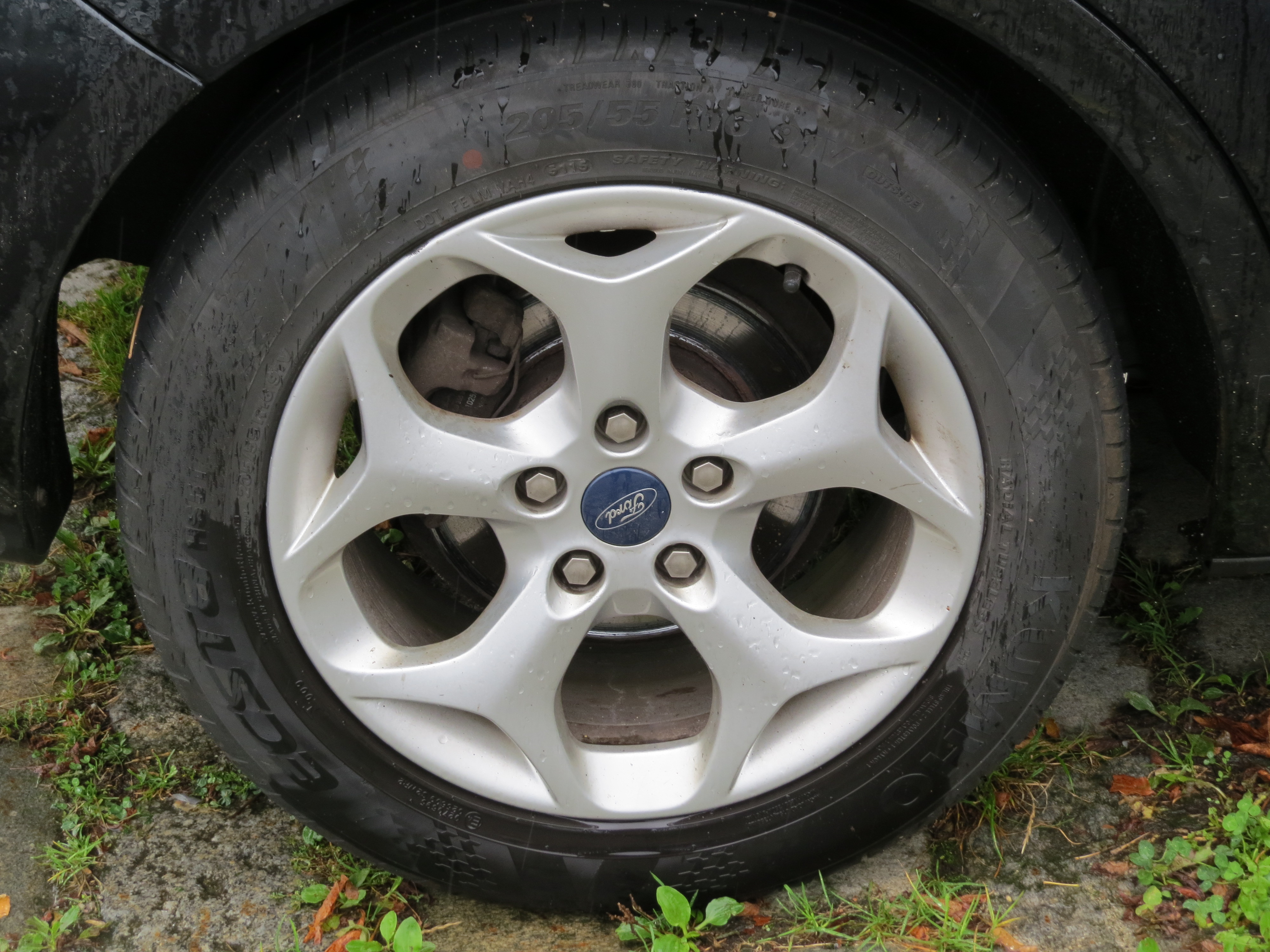
A Kumho Ecsta HS51 tire

An industrial conglomerate chaebol, Kumho Tire manufactures a full range of tires under the Kumho, Marshal & Zetum brands.

Kumho Tire runs three manufacturing facilities in South Korea: the Pyeongtaek Plant, the Gokseong Plant and the Gwangju Plant which includes the Kumho Research and Development center mentioned below. There are a further three plants in China: the Tianjin Plant, the Gaoxin Plant (in Nanjing) and the Changchun Plant. There is also one plant in Vietnam in the Binh Duong Province and one plant in the United States (Macon, Georgia).

Kumho Tire exports tires worldwide and has a global network of sales organizations.

It has three centers for research and development, with the largest in Gwangju, South Korea. The other two centers are in Akron, Ohio and Birmingham, England. These service the US and European tire markets respectively. Other research centers are located in Buchholz (Germany) and Tianjin (China).

Kumho Tyre (UK) Ltd (a subsidiary of Kumho Tire Co., Inc.) was created in 1977. Administrative functions are based in Sutton, Surrey and the marketing department is operated from Birmingham.

In December 2009, Kumho Tire was placed under debt workout, after its parent company Kumho Asiana Group was hit by a liquidity crunch from the takeover of Daewoo E&C.

On 15 March 2011, China Central Television (CCTV) reported that there were serious irregularities in the tire production process of Kumho tires. It reported that Kumho used excessive amounts of recycled rubber as raw materials in the Tianjin factory (DOT Code C0/1C0) to reduce costs, which could lead to the sidewall of tires to bulge and potentially rupture . Soon after the program was aired, Kumho Tires released a statement denying the claims. It explained that the proportion of recycled rubber should be calculated by weight, not by quantity, and that 'it was inaccurate to rely on video footage to determine the quality of tires'. On 21 March 2011, the president of Kumho Tire (II Talk Jung), and the president of Kumho Tire China (Li Hanxie) released an official statement of apology through CCTV, and issued a recall of all the affected products.

In July 2018, Chinese company Doublestar finalized a deal to acquire Kumho Tire Co., Ltd. from Kumho Asiana Group in a $607 million deal, giving Doublestar a 45 percent stake and control of South Korea's second-largest tire manufacturer.

Kumho Tire supplies OEM tyres for many vehicle manufacturers which include Audi, BMW, Chrysler, Fiat, General Motors, Genesis, Hyundai, Kia, Mercedes-Benz, Nissan and Volkswagen for their vehicles.

In October 2024, Kumho Tire won the grand prize at the "2024 Global Top Excellent Environmental Technology Awards" hosted by the Ministry of Environment and the Korea Institute of Environmental Industry and Technology. Among them, it was highly evaluated for its excellent economic and social achievements in the "Global Top Innovation Technology" category and proved environmental technology through the development of low-wear-low-carbon tires for reducing fine dust and carbon dioxide.

== Illegal union-busting ==
In May 2019, following a complaint filed by the United Steelworkers in November 2017, an administrative law judge with the National Labor Relations Board (NLRB) found that Kumho Tire had engaged in "pervasive" illegal conduct during a unionization campaign at the company's tire manufacturing plant in Macon, Georgia, with at least 12 managers including the company's CEO issuing illegal threats to lay off employees or to close the plant if it unionized, as well as illegally interrogating employees and creating an impression of surveillance. The company was subsequently required by the NLRB to read a notice to all of its workers at the plant outlining the ways in which the company had violated their rights.

== Sponsorships ==
In 2007, Kumho became a Platinum Partner of the Manchester United Football Club. The company is classed as an Official Club Sponsor. In partnership with Manchester United, Kumho launched a "Play Safer" campaign designed to increase youth road safety awareness.

The company also sponsors other motoring events such as European Formula 3 racing.

On February 13, 2014, Darren Rovell of ESPN announced on his Twitter page that Kumho was named the official tire of the NBA.

Kumho Tire is one of the sponsors of the La Liga.

In 2016, Kumho Tire entered into a global partnership with Premier League club Tottenham Hotspur FC. The company formally announced a long-term extension of the agreement in November 2021, maintaining its status as the club's official tire partner.

== Associates ==
Daehan Tire since 1991.

== See also ==
- Kumho BMW Championship
- Kumho Tire Co. v. Carmichael
- List of Korean companies
