= Matthew Barley =

English cellist (born 1965)

- Born: 2 May 1965 (age 61); London, England
- Genres: Classical, contemporary, improvisation
- Occupation: Cellist
- Instrument: Cello
- Website: matthewbarley.com

Matthew Barley (born 2 May 1965) is an English cellist. He is best known for his performances of core classical music, improvisation, and contemporary music including electronics.

== Early life and education ==
Matthew Barley was born in London and trained at the Guildhall School of Music and Drama in London and the Moscow Conservatoire. He made his London concerto debut playing the Shostakovich cello concerto in the Barbican Hall with the London Symphony Orchestra, as finalist of the LSO-Shell competition. His first CD, in 2003, was The Silver Swan for Black Box was a compilation of pieces for multitracked cellos, all of which he recorded himself using pioneering techniques of layering voices without an electronic click. His next CD, Reminding, featured Soviet music for cello and piano, and was released on Quartz in September 2005.

== Career ==
In 1997 Barley founded Between the Notes, a performance and education group who work with music and other arts.

In 2007, Barley was the music director and presenter of the BBC2 Classical Star series.

As a soloist and chamber musician he has performed in over 50 countries, including appearances with the BBC Philharmonic Orchestra, BBC Scottish Symphony Orchestra, Czech Philharmonic Orchestra, Hong Kong Sinfonietta, Melbourne Symphony Orchestra, Netherlands Radio Symphony Orchestra, New Zealand Symphony Orchestra, Royal Liverpool Philharmonic Orchestra, Royal Scottish National Orchestra, with conductors including Marin Alsop, Thomas Dausgaard, Tan Dun, Charles Hazlewood, Markus Stenz, Yan Pascal Tortelier and Ilan Volkov. He has performed at festivals in Lucerne, Schleswig-Holstein, Bonn (Beethovenfest), Hong Kong, Lanaudiere, Abu Dhabi, Krakow, City of London and at some of the world's great concert halls: London's Wigmore Hall, Royal Albert Hall, Amsterdam's Concertgebouw, Kumho Hall in Korea, Casals Hall in Tokyo, The Rudolfinum in Prague, and the Teatro Colon in Buenos Aires. A key aspect of his recitals is mixing repertoire in unusual ways, pairing Bach suites with jazz and improvisation. He is particularly interested in music with electronics, having commissioned works from many composers including Dai Fujikura, Peter Wiegold, DJ Bee, John Metcalfe and Jan Bang. He has given other premieres of pieces written for him by James MacMillan, Thomas Larcher, Detlev Glanert, John Woolrich, and Fraser Trainer.

In 2005, he toured Brett Dean's ballet score One of the Kind (for solo-on-stage-cello and electronics) with the Netherlands Dans Theatre; in 2010 with the Basel Ballet and in 2012 with Lyon Ballet.

Barley has premiered several works including some commissions, by Pascal Dusapin, Thomas Larcher, James MacMillan, Dai Fujikura, Detlev Glanert, Peter Wiegold, Fraser Trainer, Rand Steiger, John Metcalfe, John Woolrich, Dimitri Smirnov, and Deidre Gribben.

Barley's classical collaborations include with Matthias Goerne, The Labeque Sisters, Martin Fröst, Viviane Hagner and Thomas Larcher Non-classical collaborations have included with Avi Avital, Manu Delago, Ustad Amjad Ali Khan, Jon Lord (Deep Purple), Talvin Singh, Sultan Khan, Nitin Sawhney, Django Bates, and jazz pianists Julian Joseph and Nikki Yeoh.

In 2013, Barley toured the UK to celebrate the centenary of Benjamin Britten’s birth, performing 100 concerts and workshops throughout the year.

In 2019. he gave the premiere of a concerto by his stepson, jazz bassist Misha Mullov-Abbado, fusing jazz and improvisation with the BBC Concert Orchestra.

Barley records for Signum Classics in the UK, his latest disc being Tavener's The Protecting Veil.

== Personal life ==
Barley is married to violinist Viktoria Mullova. They have three children: Misha Mullov-Abbado, Katia Mullova-Brind and Nadia Mullova-Barley, and live in London. A major project of Barley and Mullova's called The Peasant Girl has seen over 40 performances worldwide. The programme features Barley's arrangements of gypsy and jazz as well as Bartók and Kodaly and has been recorded for CD and DVD on Onyx Classics.

== Selected discography ==
- The Protecting Veil, 2019. Sukhvinder ‘Pinky’ Singh (tabla), Olwyn Fouéré, Julie Christie (speakers), Sinfonietta Rīga (Signum Classics SIGCD585)
- 99 Words, 2017. Sir John Tavener & Roxana Panufnik (Signum Classics SIGCD519) Voce Chamber Choir, Suzy Digby (conductor)
- Around Britten, 2013 (Signum Classics SIGCD318)
- Face to Face with Alex Heffes, 2012 (Onyx 4050). One-on-one improvised duets with Alex Heffes
- The Peasant Girl, 2011 (Onyx Classics); With Viktoria Mullova and the Matthew Barley Ensemble
- Constant Filter, 2010 (Signum Classics SIGCD207). Music by John Metcalfe
- The Dance of the three-legged elephants, 2009 (Signum Classics SIGCD171). With Julian Joseph
- Reminding, 2005 (Quartz QTZ 2032)
- Extraordinary Improvisations, 2005 (FMR Records FMRCD234-0707)
- Knots, 2005 (Black Box BBM1095). With Viktoria Mullova
- Strings Attached, 2003 (Navras NRCD6004). Sarod and cello
- The Silver Swan, 2003 (Black Box Records BBM 1068). Multi-tracked cello
- Through the Looking Glass, 2000 (Philips, 464 184–2). With Viktoria Mullova and Between the Notes
