= Merger of Korean Air and Asiana Airlines =

South Korean government policy

- Pre-merger Korean Air logo

- Asiana Airlines current logo after the merger

- The new Korean Air logo after the merger, unveiled on March 11, 2025.
- Initiator: Korean Air
- Target: Asiana Airlines
- Type: Merger
- Cost: ₩1.5 trillion (for a 63.88% stake)
- Initiated: November 16, 2020
- Completed: December 12, 2024
- Status: Completed

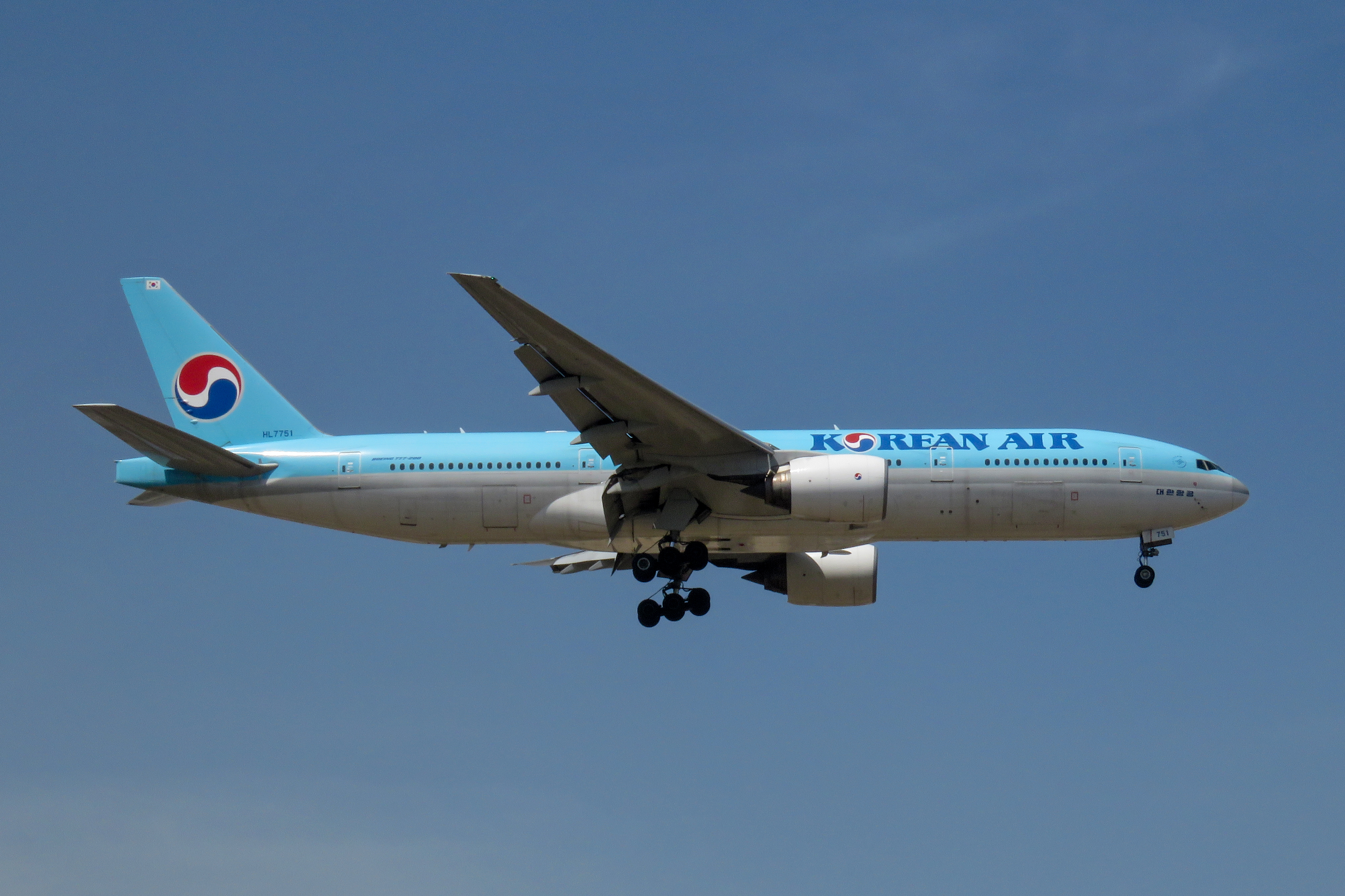
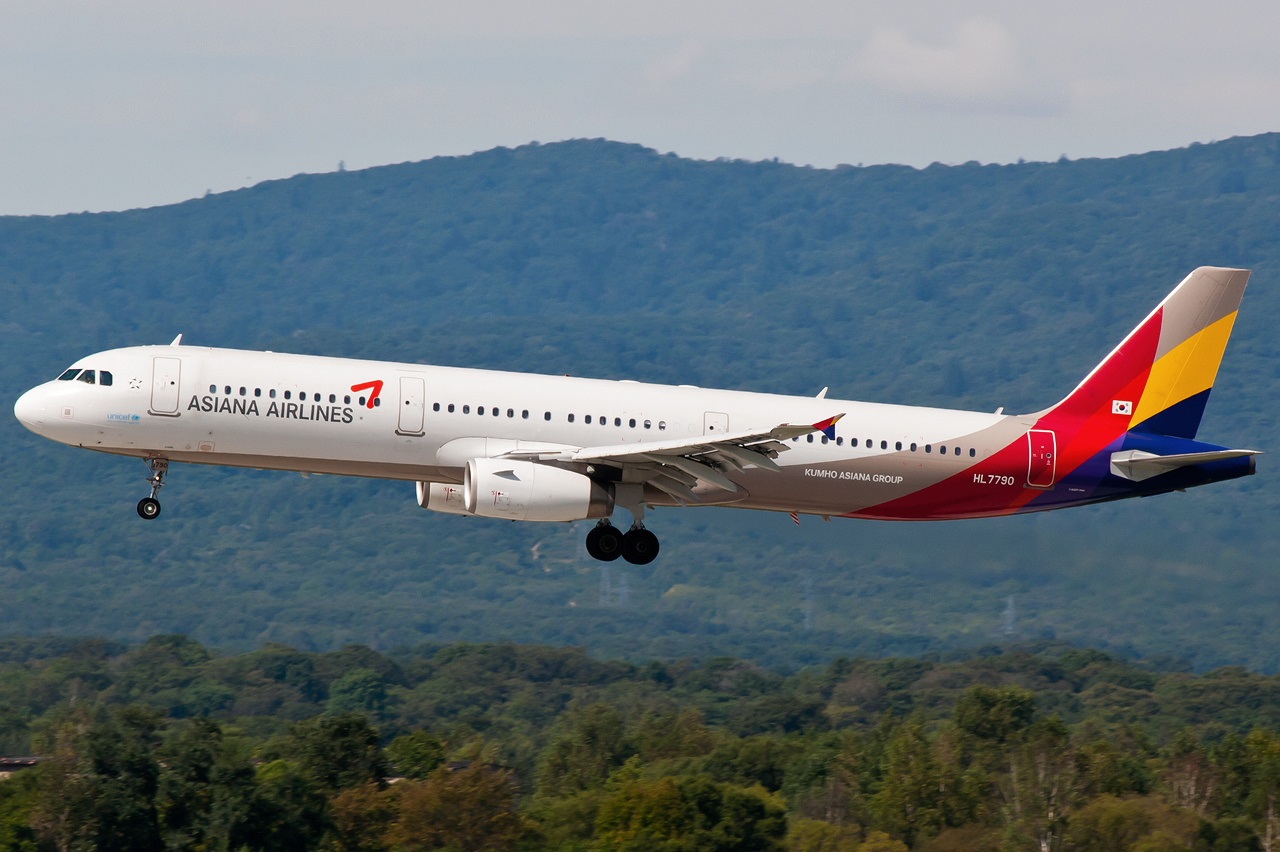
Korean Air Boeing 777-200ER (left) and Asiana Airlines Airbus A321-200 (right) aircraft with respective old logos.
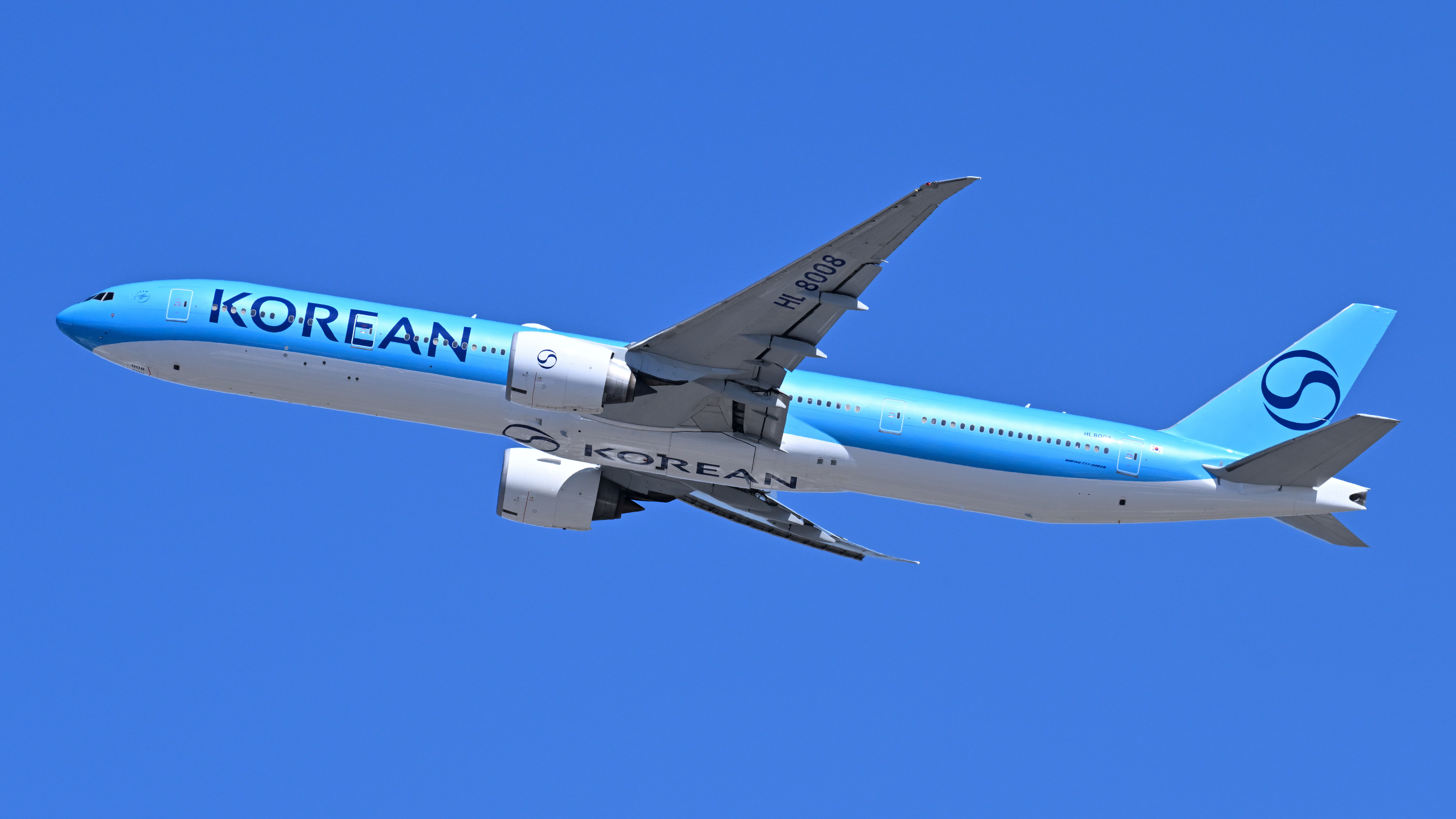
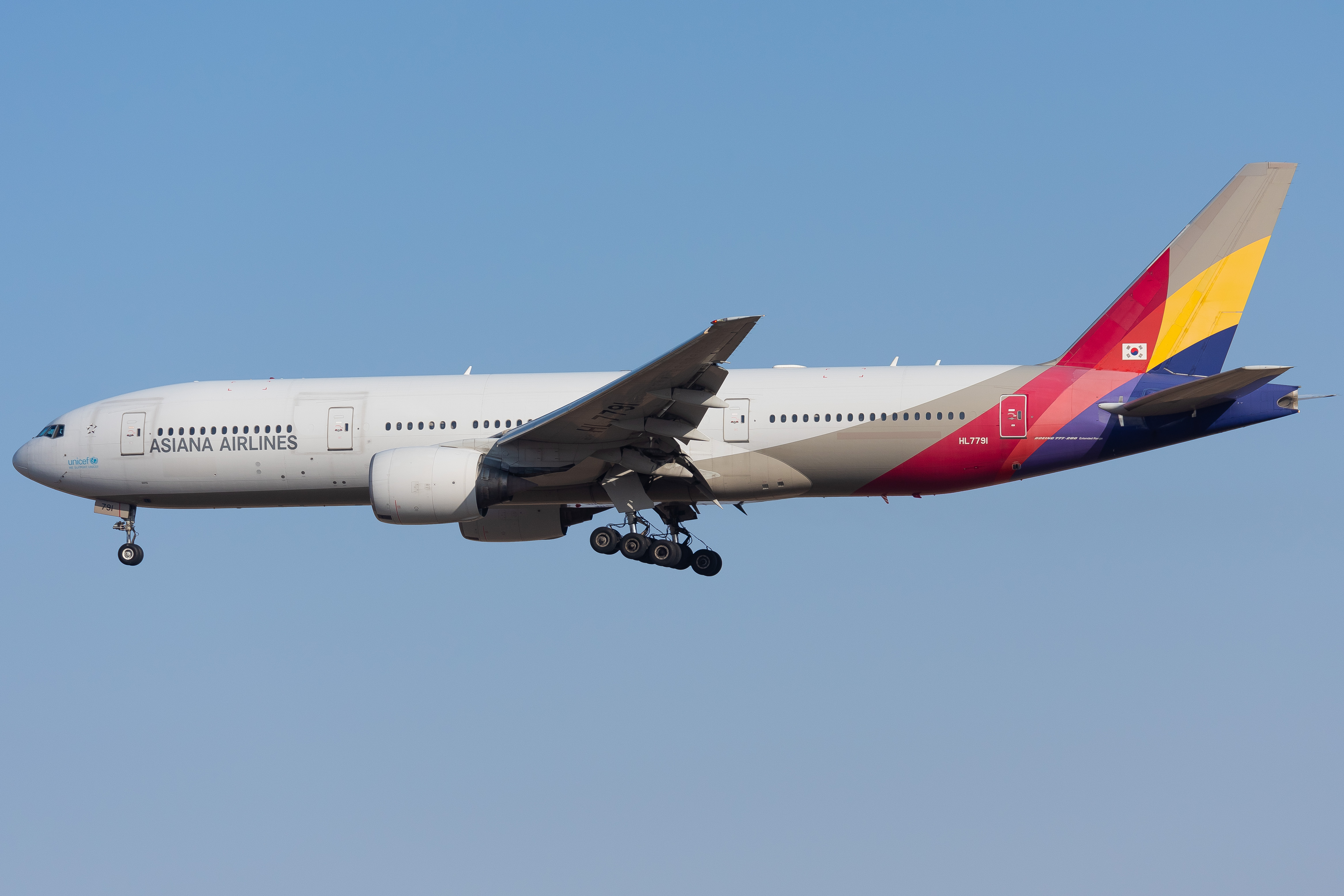
Korean Air Boeing 777-300ER (left) and Asiana Airlines Boeing 777-200ER (right) aircraft with respective new logos after the merger. In the case of Asiana, Kumho Asiana Group titles and logo are removed.

The merger of Korean Air and Asiana Airlines was a policy announced by the government of South Korea in November 2020, which resulted in Korean Air absorbing Asiana Airlines creating a dominant carrier in South Korea. The merger was completed on December 12, 2024, following approval from fair-competition authorities globally.

On March 11, 2025, Korean Air announced that the Asiana Airlines brand will be phased out by the end of 2026. Additionally, Korean Air unveiled the new logo and livery for the first time in 41 years that designed by Lippincott to symbolize the integration between two airlines.

== Background ==
On November 16, 2020, South Korea's Ministry of Land, Infrastructure and Transport announced Korean Air's proposed acquisition of Asiana Airlines. The merger plan was approved by the board of Korean Air on the same date.

Korea Development Bank, a state-owned bank, agreed to provide 800 billion won (US$655.73 million) to Hanjin Group to help finance the merger between the airlines.

Korean Air is a co-founder and member of SkyTeam while Asiana is a member of Star Alliance. If the merger is approved and completed, the combined airline would become a member of SkyTeam. If the merger proceeds, the South Korea Ministry of Land, Infrastructure and Transport intends to integrate the carriers' low-cost carrier subsidiaries (Air Busan, Air Seoul, and Jin Air) into a combined low-cost carrier which will focus on regional airports in Korea.

Specifics of the merger if approved would include the following:

- Korean Air would merge with Asiana Airlines creating a combined dominant airline in South Korea with Asiana Airlines dissolved.
- Jin Air, Korean Air's low-cost subsidiary, and Asiana's low-cost subsidiaries, Air Busan and Air Seoul, would be integrated into a separate combined low-cost carrier.

Korean Air Chairman/CEO Walter Cho and President Woo Kee-hong confirmed that the company plans to fold Asiana Club into Korean Air's SKYPASS at a later date.

In March 2021, Korean Air announced that its merger with Asiana Airlines would be delayed pending approval from relevant competition authorities. For the time being, Asiana Airlines will be operated as a subsidiary with its operations, IT, and other systems run by Korean Air until 2024.

On June 30, 2021, it was reported that the post-merger plans between the two airlines were finalized and approved by the Korea Development Bank pending regulatory approval.

== History ==
In November 2020, the government of Korea proposed the combination of Korean Air and Asiana to create a national champion carrier and rescue Asiana, which was ailing at the time.

For the merger to proceed, antitrust approval was necessary from competition authorities in key markets for the carriers. In 2021, the merger was given approval by the Department of Justice in the United States, an essential market for the carrier, pending submission and review of further remedies from the carrier. In February 2023, it was confirmed that the merger would not proceed without approval from European Union and United States authorities. At the time, the Korean government did not view approval in the EU and US as likely. Backup plans such as an equity investment from foreign backers (with the UAE-based Mubadala Investment Company suggested) into Asiana to help it remain viable were being explored.

In May 2023, it was reported that the United States Department of Justice was considering filing suit to block the merger as anticompetitive. By June 2023, the merger was viewed as increasingly unlikely given the regulatory headwinds.

In August 2023, the Korea Economic Daily reported that the Korean Development Bank was seeking a plan B in preparation for the proposed merger's collapse. This was due to a rising belief that American and European authorities would block the consolidation. On September 27, 2023, Yonhap reported that Korean Air had submitted an amended application to the European Commission, proposing divestment of Asiana's cargo division and giving up slots at some EU airports, including Barcelona, Rome, Paris, and Frankfurt to satisfy competition concerns.

As of February 2024, authorities in one essential market, the United States, had yet to approve the merger. After Korean Air switched to a new plan that consisted of acquiring a 63.88% stake of Asiana Airlines instead of a full merger, approval was granted by the U.S. Department of Justice in December 2024, which allowed the acquisition to be completed. A plan to merge the two airlines' frequent flyer programmes will be submitted to the FTC by June 2025 for review.

=== Regulatory approval dates ===
Country	Status	Notes
China	Approved	Approved by Ministry of Commerce on December 26, 2022.
European Union	Approved	Formal objection filed by the European Commission to proposed merger. Amend application submitted on November 2, 2023, and received on November 3. Conditionally approved by the European Commission on February 13, 2024. Approval obtained on November 28, 2024.
Japan	Approved	Approved by Fair Trade Commission on January 31, 2024.
South Korea	Approved	Approved by Fair Trade Commission in conditional approval on December 26, 2023.
United Kingdom	Approved	Approved by Competition and Markets Authority on May 1, 2023.
United States	Approved	Blocked by Department of Justice for monopoly concerns May 22, 2023. Approved by Department of Justice on December 2, 2024, after instead switching to acquire only a 63.88% stake.

=== China ===
On December 26, 2022, the Ministry of Commerce of China announced its approval of Korean Air's merger with Asiana Airlines.

=== European Union ===
On March 17, 2023, the European Commission (EC) released the results of an in-depth investigation concluding that the merger would restrict competition with a concentration of market power between Europe and Korea. Specifically, the Commission cited reduced competition on passenger routes between South Korea and France, Germany, Italy, and Spain and reduced competition for air cargo between all of Europe and South Korea. The Commission suspended its investigation into the merger in June 2023 due to the companies' failure to provide proposed corrective remedies before the commission's deadline.

In October 2023, Korean Air announced proposed remedies to address the commission's concerns by divesting routes to Barcelona, Frankfurt, Paris, and Rome and surrendering them (alongside slots at the relevant airports) to T'way Air, a South Korean low-cost carrier, while leasing Airbus A330 aircraft with flight crew. Korean Air would also sell Asiana Airlines' cargo division, with the Asiana board giving its approval to the plan in November 2023.

Korean Air resubmitted its application to the European Commission with these concessions for evaluation on November 2, 2023. However, Yonhap has reported that the commission has not resumed its investigation due to "missing information" in the submission provided by Korean Air and Asiana.

In January 2024, Reuters reported that the European Commission is expected to approve the merger following concessions offered by the airlines. In February 2024, Korean Air secured conditional Commission approval for the consolidation of South Korea's aviation market contingent on an acceptable buyer being identified for its cargo business and making assets available to T'way Air to start service on routes to Barcelona, Frankfurt, Paris, and Rome.

=== Japan ===
In November 2023, Japan officially moved to block the merger, citing the combined power the merged carrier would have on air traffic between Japan and South Korea where it would represent nearly 70% of flying. The objection also cited the planned merger of the two airlines' three low-cost carrier subsidiaries.

Japan approved the merger on January 31, 2024. As part of the agreement, the consolidated carrier has agreed to surrender slots on 7 routes if remedy takers choose to operate on them, the routes being Seoul–Incheon to Fukuoka, Nagoya, Osaka–Kansai, and Sapporo, as well as the Busan to Osaka, Sapporo, and Fukuoka to competitors.

=== South Korea ===
The Fair Trade Commission (FTC) approved the merger on February 22, 2022, with conditional clearance requiring the combined airline to give up some of their airport slots and transportation rights in certain regions. The Commission assessed that the merger would result in a monopoly on 26 international routes and 14 domestic routes but deferred to overseas authorities to on corrective action by granting 10 year conditional clearance with the following conditions:

- Structural measures, including transferring the domestic and international slots and transportation rights further 10 years.
- Restriction measures include limiting the price of airfare and prohibiting supply reduction.
- Maintaining the qualities of customer service
- Submitting the plan to integrate the mileage within 6 months, execute after the approval from FTC.

=== United Kingdom ===
The UK's Competition and Markets Authority (CMA) postponed the review of the merger in November 2022, citing monopoly concerns, giving Korean Air time to propose a plan to resolve competition concerns. Korean Air proposed transferring slots for seven weekly operation rights to Virgin Atlantic to launch a London–Heathrow to Seoul–Incheon route as a remedy.

The United Kingdom officially approved the merger on March 1, 2023.

=== United States ===
In May 2023, it was reported that the United States Department of Justice (DOJ) is considering filing suit to block the merger as anticompetitive.

To gain approval for the merger, Korean Air proposed transferring several operations to Air Premia. The transfer would include aircraft and flight crews. The DOJ rejected this proposal.

In December 2024, the United States Department of Justice (DOJ) gave final approval to the merger, after Korean Air decided to only acquire a 63.88% stake in Asiana Airlines instead of a full merger.

=== Non-essential countries ===
In addition to essential countries, the companies sought review of the merger by authorities in countries considered to be "non-essential" markets.

In June 2021, the Philippines was the first "non-essential country" to approve the merger. Australia, Malaysia, Singapore, Taiwan, Thailand, Turkey, and Vietnam have also officially approved the merger.

== Public reaction to proposed merger ==
In October 2023, labour unions representing workers at Asiana Airlines protested the merger claiming that the ultimate goal of the deal is "the dismantling of Asiana Airlines" and that the merger "is not in the interest of the nation or the convenience of the people".

In the United States, an analyst described the merger as a "tie-up between the largest U.S. carrier (Delta Air Lines) to South Korea and the two large South Korean airlines" virtually eliminating competition between the United States and Korea. Delta is the largest stakeholder of Hanjin Group, Korean Air's parent company.
