= Kumho Art Hall =

Classical music hall in Seoul, South Korea

Coordinates: 37.57059°N 126.972914°E

- 금호아트홀
- Interactive map of Kumho Art Hall
- Owner: Kumho Asiana Group
- Type: Concert hall

Construction
- Opened: 2000

Website
- Official website

The Kumho Art Hall (Korean: 금호아트홀) is a classical music hall in Seoul, South Korea.

== General ==
Kumho Art Hall is situated in Seoul on the third floor of the Daewoo E&C building. Performances are held more than five times a week. Three of these are part of a planned series by Kumho Asiana Cultural Foundation (KACF): Beautiful Thursday Concert Series, Kumho Prodigy Concert Series, and Kumho Young Artist Concert Series.

== Beautiful Thursday Series ==
In June 1997, Seong-Yawng Park, chairman of KACF, launched what became known as the Gallery Concert, held at Kumho Museum of Art. Following the opening of Kumho Art Hall in December 2000, the gallery concert was reborn as the Friday Special Concert Series. When this series celebrated its tenth anniversary, in June 2007, it was renamed the Beautiful Thursday Series. Established Korean artists, including Dong-Suk Kang, Daejin Kim, Kyung-wha Chung, Myung-wha Chung, and international musicians of note such as Jörg Demus, Heinz Holliger, Igor Ozim, Miriam Fried, and Matthew Barley, have performed there.
