= Hayanari Shimoda =

Japanese racing driver (born 1984)

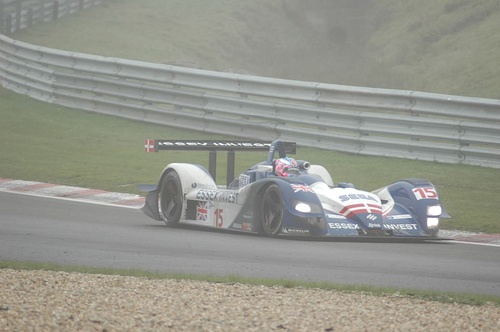
- Shimoda in 2005
- Nationality: Japanese
- Born: 16 July 1984 (age 42) Tokyo, Japan

Formula Renault 3.5 Series career
- Debut season: 2006
- Current team: Victory Engineering
- Starts: 15
- Wins: 0
- Podiums: 0
- Poles: 0
- Fastest laps: 0
- Best finish: 23rd in 2006

Hayanari Shimoda (下田隼成; Shimoda Hayanari; born July 16, 1984) is a Japanese racing driver. He was the 2005 Le Mans Endurance Series runner-up for Zytek Motorsport.

== Biography ==
Shimoda's career started in 1997 in karting, Shimoda moving up to Italian Formula Renault in 2001. Happy to travel the world to further his career, he raced part of the 2002 Japanese GT Series and fill-in races in both Formula Renault 2000 Eurocup and British Formula Renault.

A full season in Formula Renault V6 Eurocup followed in 2003, as well as a part season in the World Sportscar Championship and one race in the American Le Mans Series. Shimoda stayed in the V6 Eurocup in 2004, and was also set to drive in the Le Mans Endurance Series before complications prevented him from doing so.

Shimoda was set to be the second driver for the SuperNova team in GP2 Series during 2005. However, at the last minute, he was replaced by Adam Carroll who will now partner ex-Jordan Grand Prix driver Giorgio Pantano.

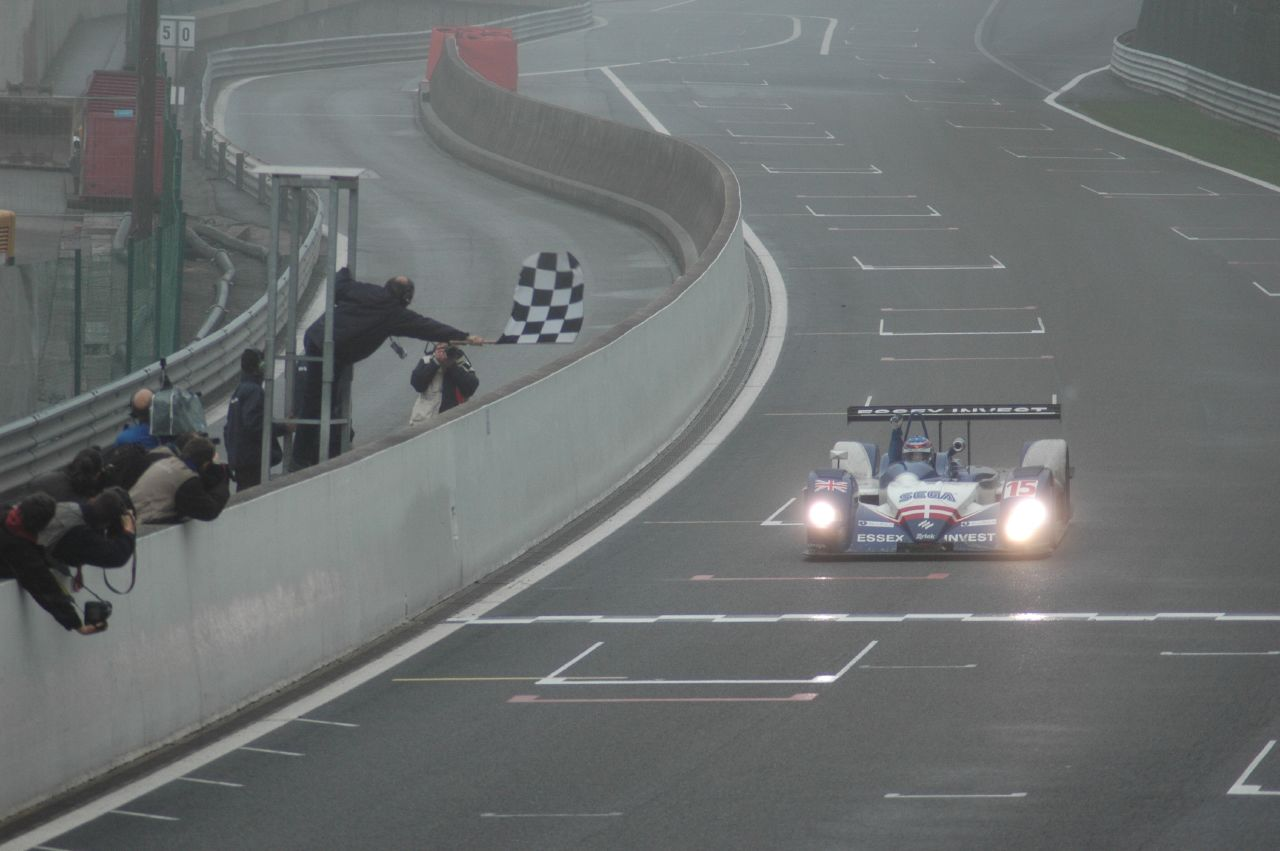
Shimoda's Zytek 04S crossing the line to win the 2005 1000 km of Spa.

Shimoda finished runner-up in the Le Mans Endurance Series LMP1 championship for Zytek, winning the 1000 km of Spa and 1000 km Nürburgring. In 2005, Shimoda won the Monterey Sports Car Championships, the final race of the season in the ALMS. He was partnered by Tom Chilton in a Zytek 04S LMP1 sports prototype.

Shimoda also represented Japan in the A1 Grand Prix series for the first time at Eastern Creek in November 2005, and was lucky to escape with only a concussion after a spectacular crash in which the engine separated from the chassis. He also occurred in another spectacular crash at the A1 Grand Prix round in Mexico. The cars were under a yellow flag when as they were coming onto the pit straight Shimoda's car was launched airborne after hitting the back of A1 Team New Zealand's car. Shimoda escaped unhurt.

In 2006, Shimoda raced in the World Series by Renault championship for the Victory Engineering team.

== Racing record ==
=== Complete 24 Hours of Le Mans results ===
Year	Team	Co-Drivers	Car	Class	Laps	Pos.	Class Pos.
2003	(United Kingdom) RN Motorsport Ltd.	(Denmark) John Nielsen (Denmark) Casper Elgaard	DBA4 03S-Zytek	LMP675	288	22nd	**2nd**
2004	(United Kingdom) Zytek Engineering Ltd.	(United Kingdom) Andy Wallace (Australia) David Brabham	Zytek 04S	LMP1	167	DNF	DNF
2007	(United Kingdom) Arena Motorsports International	(Sweden) Stefan Johansson (United Kingdom) Tom Chilton	Zytek 07S	LMP1	–	DNQ	DNQ

=== Complete American Le Mans Series results ===
Year	Entrant	Class	Chassis	Engine	1	2	3	4	5	6	7	8	9	10	11	12	Rank	Points
2003	RN Motorsports	LMP675	DBA4 03S	Zytek ZG348 3.4 L V8	SEB; Ret	ATL	SON	TRO	MOS	ROA	LAG	MIA	ATL				NC	0
2005	Zytek Engineering	LMP1	Zytek 04S	Zytek ZG348 3.4 L V8	SEB	ATL	**MOH**; 4	LIM	SON	POR	ROA	MOS	**ATL**; Ret	LAG; 1			8th	33
2007	Zytek Motorsport	LMP2	Zytek 07S/2	Zytek ZG348 3.4 L V8	SEB	STP	LBH	REL	MIL	LIM	MOH	ROA	MOS	DET	ATL	LAG; Ret	34th	6

=== Complete Le Mans Series results ===
Year	Entrant	Class	Chassis	Engine	1	2	3	4	5	6	Rank	Points
2005	Zytek Motorsport	LMP1	Zytek 04S	Zytek ZG348 3.4 L V8	SPA; 1	**MNZ**; 6	SIL; 5	NÜR; 1	IST; 4		2nd	32
2007	Arena Motorsport	LMP1	Zytek 07S	Zytek ZG348 3.4 L V8	MNZ	VAL; Ret	NÜR; 6	SPA; Ret	SIL	MIL	21st	3

=== Complete A1 Grand Prix results ===
(key) (Races in bold indicate pole position) (Races in italics indicate fastest lap)

Year	Team	1	2	3	4	5	6	7	8	9	10	11	12	13	14	15	16	17	18	19	20	21	22	DC	Points
2005–06	Japan	GBR; SPR	GBR; FEA	GER; SPR	GER; FEA	POR; SPR	POR; FEA	AUS; SPR; 18	AUS; FEA; Ret	MYS; SPR; 14	MYS; FEA; 13	UAE; SPR; 14	UAE; FEA; 15	RSA; SPR	RSA; FEA	IDN; SPR; 9	IDN; FEA; Ret	MEX; SPR; Ret	MEX; FEA; Ret	USA; SPR	USA; FEA	CHN; SPR	CHN; FEA	21st	8

=== Complete Formula Renault 3.5 Series results ===
(key) (Races in bold indicate pole position) (Races in italics indicate fastest lap)

Year	Entrant	1	2	3	4	5	6	7	8	9	10	11	12	13	14	15	16	17	DC	Points
2006	Victory Engineering	ZOL; 1; 24†	ZOL; 2; 13	MON; 1; 5	IST; 1; 7	IST; 2; 17	MIS; 1 Ret	MIS; 2 Ret	SPA; 1; 14	SPA; 2; 11	NÜR; 1 Ret	NÜR; 2; 9	DON; 1 Ret	DON; 2; 12	LMS; 1; 14	LMS; 2; 13	CAT; 1	CAT; 2	23rd	12

^{†} Driver did not finish the race, but was classified as he completed more than 90% of the race distance.
