= Air Seoul =

Low-cost airline of South Korea

Air Seoul 에어서울

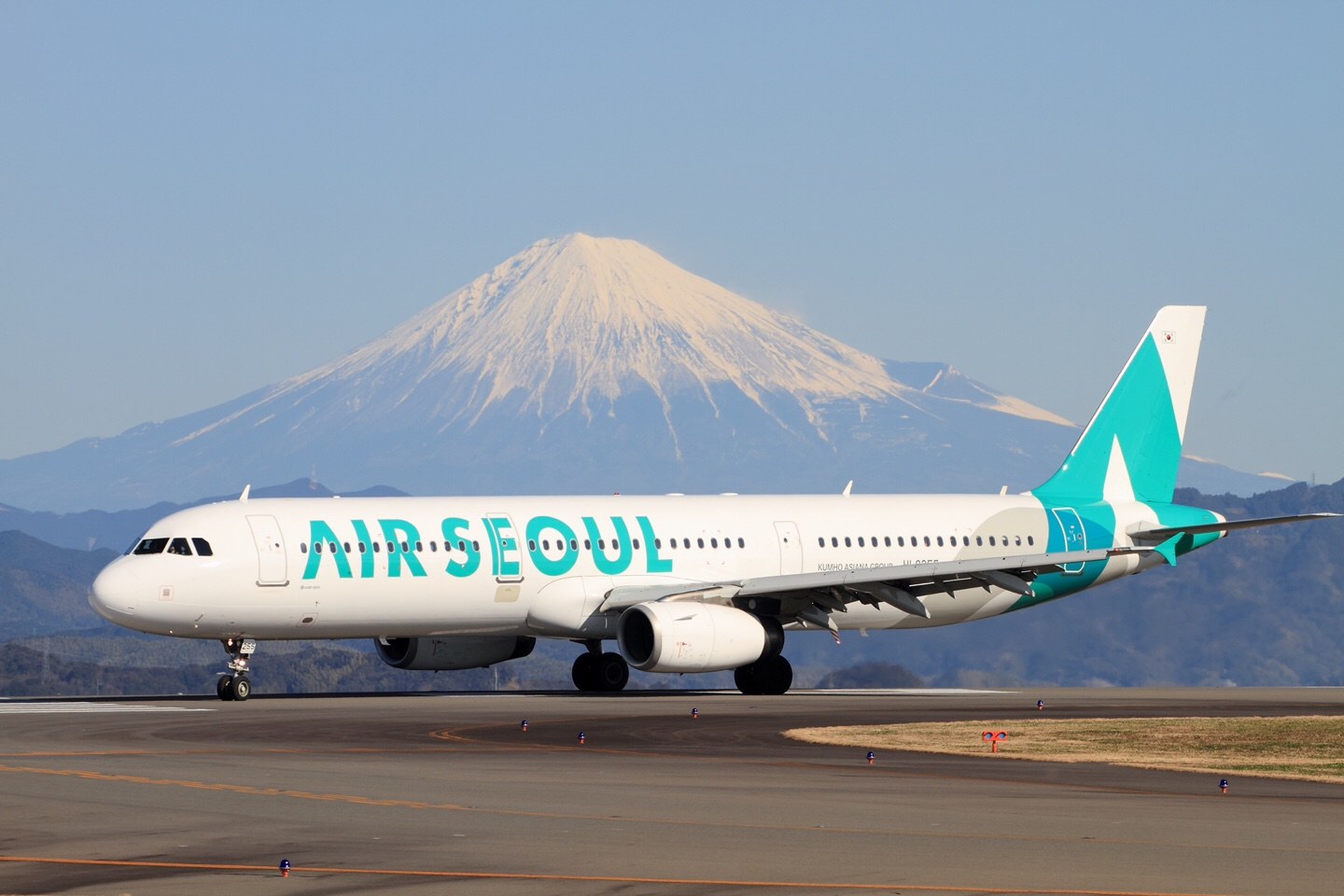
IATA	ICAO	Call sign
RS	ASV	AIR SEOUL
- Founded: 7 April 2015; 11 years ago
- Commenced operations: 11 July 2016; 10 years ago
- Operating bases: Incheon International Airport
- Frequent-flyer program: Asiana Club
- Fleet size: 6
- Destinations: 21
- Parent company: Asiana Airlines
- Headquarters: 176, Haneul-gil, Gangseo-gu, Seoul, South Korea
- Key people: Seon Wang-seong (CEO)
- Employees: 482
- Website: www.flyairseoul.com

Air Seoul (Korean: 에어서울) is a South Korean low-cost carrier and a subsidiary of Asiana Airlines. The airline is based at Incheon International Airport just outside of Seoul, from which it operates flights to international destinations. It launched operations on 11 July 2016.

== History ==
Since early 2014, Asiana Airlines had considered launching a second low-cost carrier (LCC) in addition to Air Busan. It initially faced difficulties in proceeding with the project because of the Asiana Airlines Flight 214 crash in July 2013. Asiana has only a minority 46% stake in Air Busan, while it has a controlling stake in Air Seoul. Air Busan is based in Busan, which has allowed other LCCs such as Jin Air and Jeju Air to fill the Seoul market; Air Seoul is based in Seoul. The goals of Air Seoul are to strengthen Asiana's competition with other South Korean LCCs and to improve Asiana's performance in certain markets, such as secondary Japanese cities.

The airline was established on 7 April 2015. In June 2016, Air Seoul operated trial flights within South Korea. On 5 July 2016, the Ministry of Land, Infrastructure and Transport announced it had granted Air Seoul its air operator's certificate. Flights between Seoul–Gimpo and Jeju commenced on 11 July. The airline started flights to Japan in October 2016, its first international routes and has since moved to become a purely international airline.

On 7 November 2016, Air Seoul announced that it had collaborated with Naver WEBTOON to produce a safety video. Some of the works featured in this video include Denma, The Sound of Heart, and Noblesse. Air Seoul began offering an in-flight magazine entitled Your Seoul to passengers in January 2017. The magazine advertises the tourist attractions in the airline's hub city, Seoul. In 2018, it carried 1.7 million passengers in 2018, up by 109% from 2017.

On 21 March 2019, Air Seoul with collaboration of Naver WEBTOON's LICO introduced a new in-flight safety video. Air Seoul is the first Korean airline to produce an in-flight safety video based on 3D animation created using LICO's character "Hwang-goo". On 7 October 2019, Air Seoul launched an in-flight entertainment service named "Cinema in the Sky'. On 16 December 2019, Air Seoul launched a Hanoi – Seoul route. The airline has confirmed that Tam Vuong had become an official representative of Air Seoul in Vietnam.

In 2023, the airline achieved its best-ever performance, with revenue of 310.9 billion won and operating profit of 64.4 billion won. Its operating profit margin was also the highest among domestic airlines.

As a result of Asiana Airlines merger with Korean Air, the airline, as well as Air Busan will be integrated to Jin Air, Korean Air's subsidiary. In this result, in August 2026, along with Air Busan signs of official agreement of integration with Jin Air, subsidiary of Korean Air. Air Seoul is set to be fully integrated with Jin Air by 17 March 2027.

== Corporate affairs ==
Air Seoul is a fully owned subsidiary of Asiana Airlines. Its headquarters are located in the Kumho Asiana Main Tower in Seoul, and its chief executive officer is Cho Jin-man. On 1 January 2018, Air Seoul inaugurated its new chief executive officer, formerly Ryu Kwang-hee.

On 1 January 2021, Air Seoul appointed its new chief executive officer prior to Asiana Airlines acquisition, replacing Cho Kyu-yung.

== Destinations ==
As of June 2025, Air Seoul flies (or has flown) the following destinations:

Air Seoul destinations
Country	City	Airport	Notes	Refs
Cambodia	Siem Reap	Siem Reap International Airport	Airport closed	
China	Linyi	Linyi Qiyang International Airport		
China	Yantai	Yantai Penglai International Airport		
China	Zhangjiajie	Zhangjiajie Hehua International Airport		
Guam	Hagåtña	Antonio B. Won Pat International Airport		
Hong Kong	Hong Kong	Hong Kong International Airport	Terminated	
Japan	Fukuoka	Fukuoka Airport		
Japan	Hiroshima	Hiroshima Airport	Terminated	
Japan	Kumamoto	Kumamoto Airport		
Japan	Nagasaki	Nagasaki Airport		
Japan	Naha	Naha Airport	Terminated	
Japan	Osaka	Kansai International Airport		
Japan	Sapporo	New Chitose Airport		
Japan	Shizuoka	Shizuoka Airport	Terminated	
Japan	Takamatsu	Takamatsu Airport		
Japan	Tokyo	Narita International Airport		
Japan	Toyama	Toyama Airport	Terminated	
Japan	Ube	Yamaguchi Ube Airport	Terminated	
Japan	Yonago	Yonago Kitaro Airport		
Macau	Macau	Macau International Airport	Terminated	
Malaysia	Kota Kinabalu	Kota Kinabalu International Airport		
Northern Mariana Islands	Saipan	Saipan International Airport		
Philippines	Kalibo	Kalibo International Airport	Terminated	
Philippines	Tagbilaran	Bohol–Panglao International Airport		
South Korea	Busan	Gimhae International Airport	Terminated	
South Korea	Cheongju	Cheongju International Airport	Terminated	
South Korea	Jeju	Jeju International Airport		
South Korea	Seoul	Gimpo International Airport		
South Korea	Seoul	Incheon International Airport	Hub	
Vietnam	Da Nang	Da Nang International Airport		
Vietnam	Hanoi	Noi Bai International Airport		
Vietnam	Nha Trang	Cam Ranh International Airport		

== Fleet ==
=== Current fleet ===
As of July 2026, Air Seoul operates the following aircraft:

Air Seoul fleet
Aircraft	In service	Orders	Passengers	Notes
Airbus A321-200	6	—	195	
Airbus A321-200	6	—	220	
Total	6	—		

=== Former fleet ===
As of August 2025, Air Seoul operated 6 Airbus A321.

Air Seoul also previously operated the following aircraft:

Air Seoul retired fleet
Aircraft	Total	Introduced	Retired	Notes
Airbus A321-200	3	2017	2021	Former Asiana Airlines aircraft.

== See also ==
- Asiana Airlines
- List of airlines of South Korea
- Transport in South Korea
