= Park In-chon =

South Korean businessman

- Korean name
- Hangul: 박인천
- Hanja: 朴仁天
- RR: Bak Incheon
- MR: Pak Inch'ŏn

Park In-chon (Korean: 박인천; Hanja: 朴仁天, 5 July 1901 – 16 June 1984) was a South Korean businessman. He was the founder and first head of the Kumho Asiana Group, Kumho Asiana Transportation Group and the Korean Synthetic Rubbers company.

== Issue ==
- 1st child : Park Seong-yong (17 February 1932 – 23 May 2005)
- 2nd child : Park Kyung-ae (born 1934)
- 3rd child : Park Jeong-koo (born 10 August 1937 – 13 July 2002)
- 4th child : Park Gang-ja (born 1941)
- 5th child: Park Sam-koo (born 19 March 1945)
- 6th child: Park Chan-koo (born 13 August 1948)
- 7th child: Park Hyun-ju (born 7 March 1953)
