= Zytek 2ZG408 engine =

Zytek 2ZG408

Overview
- Manufacturer: (United Kingdom) Zytek
- Production: 2006-2007

Layout
- Configuration: 90° V8 naturally-aspirated
- Displacement: 4.0 L (244 cu in)
- Valvetrain: Dual overhead camshaft (DOHC)

Combustion
- Fuel system: Electronic indirect multi-point injection
- Fuel type: Elf LMS 102 RON unleaded Gasoline; E10 Ethanol

Output
- Power output: 620 hp (462 kW) @ 9200 rpm
- Torque output: 391 lb⋅ft (530 N⋅m) @ 7500 rpm

Dimensions
- Dry weight: 123 kg (271 lb)

The Zytek 2ZG408 engine is a 4.0-litre, normally-aspirated, DOHC, V8 racing engine which was developed and produced by Zytek for sports car racing between 2006 and 2007.

== Applications ==
- Zytek 06S
- Zytek 07S
