= Kumho Asiana Group =

South Korean conglomerate

Kumho Asiana
- Native name: 금호아시아나
- Industry: Conglomerate
- Founded: 1946; 80 years ago
- Founder: Park In-chon

Kumho Asiana Group is a former large South Korean Chaebol (conglomerate), with subsidiaries in the construction, electronics, IT, leisure, logistics, manufacturing, tourism and transportation sectors. The group is headquartered at the Kumho Asiana Main Tower in Sinmunno 1-ga, Jongno-gu, Seoul, South Korea. As of 2014, the largest shareholder is Park Sam-koo, the third son of the company's founder, who stepped down as CEO in 2010.

== History ==
After World War II, Park In-chon began a taxi service, based out of Geumnamno in Seo-gu, Gwangju. By the 1950s, operations had expanded to include bus and coach services, operating as Gwangju Passenger Service (today, Kumho Buslines).

The company began vertical integration in 1960 with the establishment of Samyang Tire, today Kumho Tire. Facing a shortage of raw material, Kumho Synthetic Rubber (today Kumho Petrochemical) was established in 1971. The group expanded considerably as the Korean economy boomed, adding subsidiary companies in aviation, construction, culture, logistics, information technology, and tourism business sectors. It was the parent company of the entertainment company On-Media (along with Tongyang Group and Orion Group), until its acquisition by the CJ Group in 2010.

Surviving the 1997 Asian financial crisis in a position of strength, it acquired several companies from cash-strapped competitors in the 2000s, including Daewoo Engineering & Construction and Korea Express. These acquisitions were heavily leveraged, leading to cash flow issues as the 2008 financial crisis began to impact the economy. The group was forced to sell off assets and begin a debt workout program in late 2009 after an attempt to sell Daewoo E&C failed on the open market.

In December 2015, Kumho Petrochemical was spun off from Kumho Asiana Group in order to raise capital for the company's remaining subsidiaries.

In an effort to restructure, the group sold its controlling 45 percent stake in Kumho Tire to Chinese tire company Doublestar in July 2018.

In April 2019, the company sold its controlling stake in Asiana Airlines to help pay down mounting credit debt which eventually resulted to the merger of Asiana with Korean Air in 2024. On February 27, 2025, the Kumho Asiana Group was delisted from the list of large conglomerates by the Fair Trade Commission.

== Subsidiaries ==
- Asiana Abacus
- Asiana IDT
- Jeokho Academy
- Kumho Art Museum
- Kumho Art Hall
- Kumho Asiana Cultural Foundation
- Kumho Asiana Human Resources Development Institute
- Kumho Buslines - Reacquired from KoFC IBK Kaystone PEF in May 2015.
- Kumho Electric
- Kumho Engineering and Construction
- Kumho Industrial Company
- Showbox (with entertainment arm of Orion Group)

== See also ==
- Economy of South Korea
- Chaebol
- List of South Korean companies
