= Rockhurst Hawklets football =

The Rockhurst Hawklets football team is one of the most successful high school football programs in Missouri. The team is composed of students from Rockhurst High School in Kansas City, Missouri and has made the most state championship appearances of any school in Missouri. Their main rivals are Blue Springs High School, Bishop Meige High School, Shawnee Mission East High School, and CBC.

== Championships ==
Rockhurst is the only school to win a championship in each major state championship venue in the state of Missouri: Busch Stadium, Arrowhead Stadium, Faurot Field at the University of Missouri, and the Edward Jones Dome. The program also won a championship in a "non-championship" venue: its first championship, in 1971, at William Chrisman High School, against St. Louis Beaumont.

Its nine football championships is ranked fourth in Missouri history, behind Jefferson City, Valle Catholic, and Webb City high schools. The team has been to more state championships (14) than any other school. Five Rockhurst teams have won Missouri state championships with perfect records: 1971, 2000, 2002, 2007, and 2010. The 2000, 2002, 2007, and 2010 teams finished the season nationally ranked 14th, 6th, 20th, and 19th respectively. All teams finished the season undefeated with records of 14–0, 13–0, 13–0, and 14–0 respectively. The back-to-back state championship teams of 1986 and 1987 also finished nationally ranked, 14th and 13th respectively (after finishing 11–1 and 12–1).

Additionally, the last three head coaches of Rockhurst's football team, Al Davis, Jr., Jerry Culver, and Tony Severino, are all members of Missouri's High School Coaches Hall of Fame, and all won state championships with the Hawklets. Davis was a three-time recipient of the Knute Rockne Award, and Severino was named USA Today's National Coach of the Year in 2000.

=== State championship appearances ===
Year	Record	Result
1969	9–3	Runner-Up
1971	11–0	Champions
1973	10–2	Runner-Up
1981	12–1	Champions
1982	13–1	Runner-Up
1983	12–2	Champions
1986	11–1	Champions
1987	12–1	Champions
1989	10–3	Runner-Up
1999	12–2	Runner-Up
2000	14–0	Champions
2002	13–0	Champions
2007	13–0	Champions
2010	14–0	Champions
2014	12–2	Runner-Up
2018	11–3	Runner-Up
State Championships	9	
State Runners-up	7	

=== Player awards ===
The most outstanding high school football player in the greater Kansas City Metropolitan Area is awarded what was first christened the Dr. D.M. Nigro Award in 1931, and known since 1983 as the Thomas A. Simone Memorial Award. The following are the Rockhurst players who have won this award:

- 1939 – John Steck
- 1942 – Len Lecluyse
- 1947 – Bob Williams
- 1952 – Alonzo Robinson
- 1954 – Alex George, Jr.
- 1971 – Chris Cummings
- 1974 – Carl Tutorino
- 1986 – Tim Ryan
- 1987 – Kenyon Rasheed
- 1998 – Sean Doyle
- 1999 – Brandon Shelby
- 2007 – Nathan Scheelhaase

== Record ==
=== By coach ===
As of May 27, 2020

Year	Coach	Years at RHS	W	L	T	Winning %
1916	Charlie Alan	1	5	2	0	71.4%
1917	Louis Gainey	1	2	3	2	28.6%
1918	Doc Nigro	1	1	1	1	33.3%
1919–1925	Pat Mason	7	27	17	6	54.0%
1926–1935	Ed Halpin	10	52	21	6	65.8%
1936–1940	Martin O’Keefe	5	27	10	3	67.5%
1941–1945	Godfrey Kobets	5	34	6	1	82.9%
1946–1948	Ralph Cormany	3	20	6	1	74.05%
1949–1950	Gerry Connelly	2	12	4	1	70.6%
1951	Dick Deitchman	1	5	4	0	55.6%
1952–1975	Al Davis, Jr. †	24	154	66	13	66.1%
1976–1982	Jerry Culver †	7	63	16	0	79.7%
1983–2019	Tony Severino †	37	338	88	1	79.1%
2020–Present	Kelly Donohoe †	6	40	24	0	60.0%
Totals		105	740	244	35	72.6%
Statistics as of the end of the 2020 season. † Member of the Missouri Coaches Hall of Fame

=== By opponent ===
As of September 4, 2022

School	Years	Record**
De LaSalle	1918–1970	32–13–5
Southwest	1925–1995	26–3–5
KCKS Catholic/Ward	1916–1978	26–18–3
Blue Springs	1981–2021	32–25–0
Jefferson City	1976–2019	28–15–0
Paseo	1926–1963	23–11–2
Lee’s Summit	1919–2020	23–1–0
St. Agnes/Bishop Miege	1957–2021	24–7–1
Columbia Hickman	1971–2015	22–9–0
Liberty	1917–2013	18–7–0
Liberty North	2020	0–1
Pem Day	1916–1959	16–1–1
North Kansas City	1941–2001	16–6–0
Blue Springs South	1995–2021	21–6–0
Lee’s Summit North	1996–2020	16–0–0
Lee’s Summit west	2021	4–0–0
Hogan	1943–1963	13–0–0
Southeast	1938–2001	13–2–0
Raytown South	1966–1993	13–6–0
Raytown	1955–1999	13–7–1
Oak Park	1973–2005	12–1–0
Northeast	1930–1952	12–3–0
Glennon	1943–1954	11–1–0
St. Benedict/Maur Hill	1927–1960	11–2–1
Joplin	2002–2011	10–0–0
Redemptorist	1943–1954	10–1–0
Grandview	1979–1993	9–0–0
St. Thomas Aquinas, KS	1991–1999	9–0–0
Lillis	1943–1954	9–0–3
O’Hara	1971–1981	9–1–1
Columbia Rock Bridge	1981–2019	12–3–0
Columbia Battle	2019–2020	2–0
Westport	1929–1972	9–1–0
SM West, KS	1974–1990	9–6–0
Immaculata	1933–1941	8–1–0
SM East, KS	1963–2017	10–3–0
St. Joseph Catholic/Christian Bro.	1916–2021	9–9–3
KC Central	1924–1997	8–7–1
SM Northwest, KS	1981–1988	7–0–0
Kapaun/Mt. Carmel, KS	1957–1986	7–2–0
Ruskin	1964–1978	7–3–0
Truman	1966–1995	6–0–0
Van Horn	1969–1990	6–0–0
St. Louis Sumner	1973–2001	6–2–0
Springfield Kickapoo	1989–2016	7–0–0
Hazelwood Central	1981–2010	5–0–0
Garden City, KS	1996–2001	5–1–0
Hutchinson	2008–2013	5–1–0
St. Pius X	1962–1974	5–1–0
SM North, KS	1946–1980	5–2–0
William Chrisman	1921–1993	5–6–0
Park Hill	1982–2021	6–3–0
St. Peter/Helias	1942–1948, 2015	5–0–0
Topeka Cath./Hayden	1923–1960	4–0–0
Wyandotte	1973–1986	4–0–0
KC East	1930–1982	4–1–1
St. Mary’s, KS	1922–1930	4–1–0
Argentine	1916–1941	4–4–0
Ft. Smith Northside, AR	1987–1997	4–6–1
Raymore Peculiar	2010–2012	7–4–0
St. Joseph Central	1983–1989	3–0–0
Winnetonka	1981–1989	3–0–0
Carrollton	1919–1926	3–4–0
Central AC	1917–1918	2–0–0
Dallas Jesuit, TX	2002–2003	2–0–0
Fayetteville, AR	1989–1990	2–0–0
Gulf Shores Acad., TX	2002–2003	2–0–0
Hickman Mills	1987–1989	2–0–0
KC Lincoln	1955–1956	2–0–0
Lincoln East, NE	1983–1984	2–0–0
Minnetonka, MN	2007–2008	2–0–0
Olathe North, KS	1998–1999	2–0–0
Park Hill South	2000–2001	2–0–0
Rosemount, MN	1994–1995	2–0–0
SM South, KS	1987–1988	2–0–0
Warrensburg	1923–1924	2–0–0
Wichita Northwest, KS	1994–1995	2–0–0
E. St. Louis Lincoln, IL	1987–2013	2–1–0
Lincoln Southeast, NE	1991–1993	2–1–0
Becker, MN	2006-2006	1–0–0
Center	1985-1985	1–0–0
DeSoto	1920-1920	1–0–0
Dowling, IA	1982-1982	1–0–0
Edina, MN	2002-2002	1–0–0
Edmond Santa Fe, OK	2007-2007	1–0–0
Har-Ber, AR	2014–2015	1–1–0
Harrisonville	1922-1922	1–0–0
Haskel	1947-1947	1–0–0
Henderson Basic, NV	2000-2000	1–0–0
Hopkins, MN	2001-2001	1–0–0
Joliet Catholic, IL	2002-2002	1–0–0
Pomona	2017	1–0–0
KC Sumner, KS	1965-1965	1–0–0
Lathrop	1916-1916	1–0–0
Lindbergh	2002-2002	1–0–0
Manuel	1929-1929	1–0–0
St James Academy KS	2021	1–0–0
Osawatamie, KS	1939-1939	1–0–0
Pattonville	2000-2000	1–0–0
Poplar Bluff	1985-1985	1–0–0
Smithville	1926-1926	1–0–0
St. Louis University High	1983-1983	1–0–0
Waterloo West, IA	1991-1991	1–0–0
Ctry. Club Dist. AC	1916–1917	1–1–1
Desmet	2005–2021	1–2–0
Higginsville	1920–1922	1–1–0
Mehlville	1999–2007	1–1–0
Mullen, CO	2008–2009	1–1–0
Springdale, AR	1984–1988	1–2–0
Bentonville, AR	2012–2021	3–5–0
KCKU Prep	1919-1919	0–0–1
Norborne	1922-1922	0–0–1
Odessa	1923-1923	0–0–1
Abilene, TX	2005-2005	0–1–0
Excelsior Springs	1917-1917	0–1–0
Evangel Christian, LA	2003-2003	0–1–0
Gardner	1917-1917	0–1–0
Hazelwood East	1989-1989	0–1–0
Joplin Parkwood	1975-1975	0–1–0
Marshall	1925-1925	0–1–0
McCluer	1969-1969	0–1–0
McLouth	1922-1922	0–1–0
Overland Aurora, CO	1995-1995	0–1–0
Blue Valley, KS	2020	1–1–0
Richmond	1932-1932	0–1–0
Webb City	2014–2015	0–2–0
