= QEBH =

Honor society at the University of Missouri

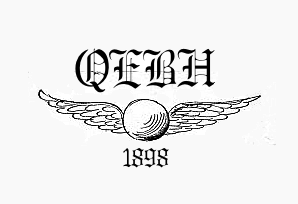
- Founded: November 1898; 128 years ago University of Missouri
- Type: Honor
- Affiliation: Independent
- Status: Active
- Emphasis: Senior
- Scope: Local
- Symbol: Winged sphere
- Chapters: 1
- Headquarters: Columbia, Missouri 65201; United States

QEBH is a senior honor society at the University of Missouri. Founded in 1898, it is the oldest of six recognized secret honor societies that participate in the annual tradition of Tap Day on campus.

== History ==
The society was founded at the University of Missouri in November 1898 by eight male students. They were Gurry Ellsworth Huggins, Clarence Martin Jackson, Thomas Benton Marbut, Antoine Edward Russell, Royall Hill Switzler, William Frank Wilson, Horace Beckley Williams, and Galius Lawton Zwick.

Switzler organized the first class of the society and is considered the founder of QEBH. QEBH's workings, purposes, and affairs are known only to its members.

Throughout its history, QEBH has maintained a rivalry with MU's Mystical Seven society. This rivalry has often involved the two societies playing pranks on each other. In one instance in 1985, members of QEBH disguised themselves as members of Mystical Seven and surprised Mystical Seven's yet-to-be-initiated candidates at 4:30 am one morning. The new candidates were convinced the activity was part of their initiation process, and they were taken to Jefferson City, Missouri where they were dropped off and abandoned by the disguised QEBH members.

== Symbols ==
Tap Day 2006

The meaning of the society's name is known only to the members. The primary symbol of QEBH is the winged sphere. The symbol's origin is that of the winged sphere that was once the distinctive mark of Jesse Hall. The wings broke from the top of the dome when a patriotic student scaled the dome one night around the time of World War I and fastened the staff of a large American flag to the structure. The flag caught enough wind to tear the wings from the dome, leaving only the golden sphere, which is still in place. The destruction of the wings from the dome was foreshadowed in the 1901 Savitar where mention is made of QEBH's secret meetings at the top of the dome, but it was later stated that "QEBH didn't take the wings off the dome."

The tradition of the Victory Bell originated in 1927. The bell was originally stolen from a church in Seward, Nebraska by Phi Delta Theta and Delta Tau Delta in 1892. The two fraternities shared housing at the time, but when the groups later acquired their own individual houses they began an annual tradition of awarding the bell as a trophy to the winner of a specified athletic or academic contest. When then Missouri athletic director Chester Brewer suggested a trophy be established for the winner of the annual Missouri–Nebraska Rivalry football game, the bell was chosen to fill the role. An "M" was then engraved on one side of the bell and an "N" was engraved on the opposite side. QEBH is the caretaker of the bell at Missouri, and the Innocents Society is the caretaker of the bell at Nebraska. Due to conference realignment, there has been a hiatus of the Missouri-Nebraska rivalry since 2010.

== Notable members ==
- Ben Askren (Chapter of 2006), 2006 NCAA individual national wrestling champion and Sports Illustrated collegiate wrestler of the year
- Hardin Cox (Chapter of 1952), Missouri House of Representatives and Missouri Senate
- Forrest C. Donnell (Chapter of 1904), former Governor of Missouri
- Martin Frost (Chapter of 1964), U.S. House of Representatives
- John R. Gibson (Chapter of 1950), Senior Federal Judge, U.S. Court of Appeals for the Eighth Circuit
- Kenny Hulshof (Chapter of 1999), U.S. House of Representatives
- Tim Kaine (Chapter of 1979), United States Senator, Governor of Virginia, and U.S. Vice Presidential Candidate
- Richard D. Kinder (Chapter of 1966), CEO of Kinder Morgan
- Derrick Peterson (Chapter of 1999), US Olympic Track and Field Athlete in 2004
- Austin Ruse (Chapter of 1979), Columnist, Author, Political Activist
- Ike Skelton (Chapter of 1957), U.S. House of Representatives
- Steve Stipanovich (Chapter of 1983), professional basketball player
- Jon Sundvold (Chapter of 1981), professional basketball player
- Sam M. Walton (Chapter of 1940), founder of Walmart
- Kellen Winslow (Chapter of 1987), professional football player and NFL Hall of Fame

=== Honorary members ===
- Christopher S. "Kit" Bond, U.S. Senator
- August Busch Jr. (Chapter of 1969), American brewing magnate and former owner of the St. Louis Cardinals
- Brady Deaton (Chapter of 1999), former University of Missouri chancellor
- Thomas F. Eagleton (Chapter of 1964), former U.S. Senator
- Chuck Graham (Chapter of 2006), Missouri State Senator
- Warren E. Hearnes (Chapter of 1966), former Governor of Missouri
- Darwin Hindman (Chapter of 2004), former mayor of Columbia, Missouri
- R. Bowen Loftin (Chapter of 2015), former University of Missouri chancellor
- Claire McCaskill (Chapter of 2003), United States Senator
- Gary Pinkel (Chapter of 2016), University of Missouri head football coach from 2001–2015
- Pinkney Walker (Chapter of 1962), former University of Missouri economics professor who served on the Federal Power Commission
- Richard Wallace (Chapter of 1998), former University of Missouri chancellor
- H. Clyde Wilson Jr. (Chapter of 1972), former University of Missouri anthropology professor and former mayor of Columbia, Missouri
- Cuonzo Martin (Chapter of 2020), University of Missouri head basketball coach from 2017–2022
- Robert Pugh (Chapter of 2020), former mayor of Columbia, Missouri
- Eliah Drinkwitz (Chapter of 2021), University of Missouri head football coach from 2020–Present
- Jann Carl (Chapter of 2025), American broadcast journalist, producer, and three-time Emmy Award-winning television personality

== See also ==
- LSV (society)
- Mystical Seven (Missouri)
