= Park Jeong-koo =

- 박정구
- Born: August 10, 1937; Gwangju, South Korea
- Died: July 13, 2002 (aged 64); Seoul, South Korea
- Education: Chonnam National University (LLB, Hon. Ph.D. in Business Administration, 1995)
- Occupation: Businessperson
- Title: 2nd chairman of Kumho Asiana Group
- Predecessor: Park Seong-yawng
- Successor: Park Sam-koo

Park Jeong-koo (Korean: 박정구; August 10, 1937 – July 13, 2002) was a South Korean businessman who served as the second chairman of the Kumho Asiana Group from 1996 until his death in 2002.

Park was born in Gwangju as the second son of Park In-cheon, the founder of the Kumho Group. He graduated from Gwangju Jeil High School and earned a bachelor's degree in law from Chonnam National University.

Park joined Kumho Asiana Group in 1960 and succeeded his older brother as chairman in 1996.

He died July 13, 2002, from lung cancer after initial diagnosis in February 2001.

== Personal life ==
Park practiced Buddhism. He has three daughters and one son.
