= Mystical Seven (Missouri) =

University of Missouri secret society

- M7
- Founded: May 24, 1907; 118 years ago University of Missouri
- Type: Secret
- Affiliation: Independent
- Status: Active
- Emphasis: Seniors
- Scope: Local
- Colors: Black and Gold
- Chapters: 1
- Members: 7 active 600+ lifetime
- Headquarters: Columbia, Missouri; United States

Mystical Seven (M7) is a secret society at the University of Missouri in Columbia, Missouri. Mystical Seven chooses seven outstanding seniors for membership each year. Founded in 1907, Mystical Seven is the second oldest of the secret honor societies at the university.

== History ==
The origins of the society were made plain by its founder, Harold Spencer Williams. "I conceived the idea of a new and different Senior Society, [and] picked out six outstanding members of the Junior Class in 1907. I asked each one to come by the President's office for a chat. Each one was enthusiastic. We met and organized and would announce the society in the Spring of 1907. This was done." Williams was also a member of Delta Tau Delta and Phi Mu Alpha.

There is no relationship with the formerly national society established at Wesleyan University. Although a relationship is often suggested between Missouri's Mystical Seven and a similar secret honor society at the University of Virginia known as the Seven Society, no direct evidence has ever been shown that any type of relationship exists between the two societies.

The society was historically all-male, but initiated its first female member in 1920. Mary Chorn Hazard was admitted due to her exceptional record of student activities and stout sponsorship by J. Craig Ruby, who was also a member of M7 as well as Phi Kappa Psi.

It has a rivalry with QEBH.

== Symbols and traditions ==
=== Colors ===
The colors of Mystical Seven are black and gold.

=== Peace pipe ===
In 1929, Mizzou athletic director Chester M. Brewer, along with the Mystical Seven, began the tradition of smoking the Tiger–Sooner Peace Pipe at halftime of the annual Missouri–Oklahoma football game. The peace pipe became a traveling trophy in 1940, when a pipe was donated by John S. Knight, the former president of the MU's Men's Alumni Association. The pipe had belonged to Chief White Eagle of the Pawnee tribe, and it was believed to be at least 100 years old at the time it was donated. The tradition of the peace pipe as a traveling trophy was entrusted to MU's Mystical Seven and OU's PE-ET, who would share the peace pipe in the end zone at halftime to celebrate the two universities. The society of the winning university would return the peace pipe to its university until the next meeting of the two teams.

For unknown reasons, the exchange of the peace pipe stopped after the 1974 football season, with the pipe in possession of the University of Oklahoma. Following the 1998 victory over Oklahoma by Missouri, the Missouri Alumnus magazine published an article in 1999 regarding the former tradition that brought new interest in its revival. Oklahoma's athletic director, Joe Castiglione, was quoted as promising to look for the missing peace pipe. While the two schools regularly played in all sports when both were members of the Big Eight Conference, annual football games ended after the 1995 season, when the Big 12 Conference began play. They continued to play annually in other sports, most notably men's basketball, until Missouri left the Big 12 for the Southeastern Conference in 2012; since then, the men's basketball teams have played twice, once in the 2014–15 season as part of the Big 12/SEC Challenge and once in the 2020-2021 NCAA Tournament. However, Oklahoma joined the SEC on July 1, 2024. With the pipe still missing, the traditional exchange was replaced by a piece of slate from MU's Memorial Union, as both Missouri and Oklahoma have a Memorial Union.

== Notable members ==
- Matt Bartle, Missouri State Senator (R)
- Byron Calame, Second public editor of the New York Times
- Walter McCormick, President & CEO, United States Telecom Association
- Brock Olivo, MU Football alum (jersey #27 retired), left Mizzou as all-time leading rusher and held record for most rushing touchdowns. The former NFL player (Detroit Lions, 5 seasons) ran for U.S. Congress in 2008.
- Keith Weber, quarterback and pitcher
- Roger Wehrli, Hall of Fame NFL cornerback

== See also ==
- Honor society
- LSV (society)
- QEBH
