= Choi Hyun-man =

South Korean businessman (born 1961)

- 최현만
- Born: 1961 (age 64–65); South Korea
- Education: Chonnam National University (BA)
- Occupation: Financial executive
- Title: Executive Advisor, Mirae Asset Financial Group

Choi Hyun-man (Korean: 최현만; born 1961) is a South Korean businessman. He is a cofounder of the company Mirae Asset Financial Group.

== Education ==
Choi Hyun-man attended Chonnam National University, where he earned a Bachelor of Arts in Political Science and International Relations (Class of 1980). In June 2022, the university awarded him an Honorary Doctorate in Business Administration in recognition of his long-standing leadership in the financial industry and his contributions to his alma mater.

== Career ==
Choi is a co-founder of the Mirae Asset Financial Group, having joined the firm at its founding in 1997. He has held several senior executive roles within the group, and was the CEO of various subsidiaries, including Mirae Asset Securities, Mirae Asset Global Investments, Mirae Asset Capital, and Mirae Asset Life Insurance.

In December 2021, Choi was promoted to Chairman of Mirae Asset Securities. This appointment was noted as a significant milestone in the South Korean financial sector, as he became the first professional manager—who is not a member of a founding family—to rise to the position of chairman in a major brokerage firm. Under his leadership, the firm grew into a global-tier investment bank.

Following a leadership transition in late 2023, Choi stepped down from his active management role and was appointed as an Executive Advisor to the Mirae Asset Group.
