= Brady J. Deaton =

American educator (born 1942)

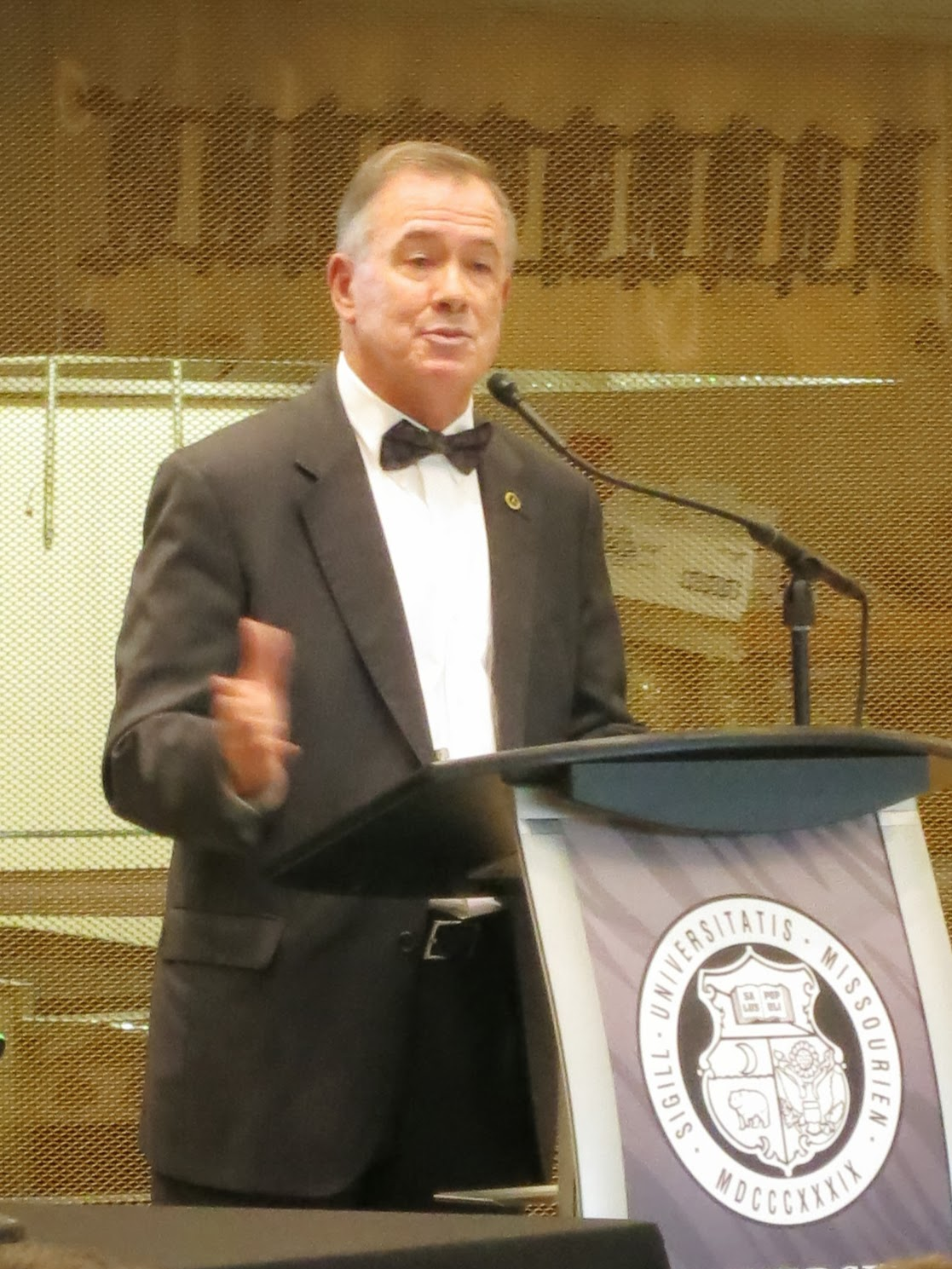
- Deaton speaks out against House Bill 253 at the University of Missouri in September 2013.
- Born: August 25, 1942 (age 83)
- Education: University of Kentucky (BS, MA); University of Wisconsin–Madison (MA, PhD); Chonnam National University (Hon. Ph.D. in Literature, 2005)

Brady J. Deaton, (born August 25, 1942) is an American educator and the former chancellor of the University of Missouri in Columbia, Missouri.

== Early life and education ==
Deaton was born on August 25, 1942. He received a Bachelor of Science degree in Agricultural Economics from the University of Kentucky in 1966 and a Master's Degree in Diplomacy and International Commerce from the same institution in 1968. From there, he moved to the University of Wisconsin, where he earned a second master's degree in 1970 and, two years later, a Ph.D. in Agricultural Economics. Deaton was a Peace Corps volunteer in Nan, Thailand from 1962-1964. He taught vocational agriculture in the Thai language.

== Academic career ==
After receiving his Ph.D. in 1972, Deaton accepted a position at the University of Tennessee, where he taught agricultural economics and rural sociology. During his tenure at Tennessee, he briefly left to serve as staff director of the Special Task Force on Food for Peace at the U.S. Department of Agriculture in Washington, D.C. In 1978, Deaton accepted a full professorship at Virginia Tech in the Department of Agricultural Economics, where he also served as coordinator of the rural development research and extension program. Deaton spent 12 years at Virginia Tech, the last four as associate director of the Office for International Development. In March 1989, he joined the faculty of the University of Missouri as professor and chair of the Agricultural Economics Department.

Deaton has published over 100 articles and has co-written three books on agricultural economics. He has also participated in a number of advisory roles with the U.S. Department of Agriculture. His research has taken him to over a dozen countries, and he has advised governors, universities, major corporations and diplomats on various topics related to agriculture, global trade and higher education.

== Administrative career ==
Deaton transitioned from faculty to administration in 1993, when he was appointed chief of staff to the chancellor of the University of Missouri. He was promoted to deputy chancellor in 1997. In January 1998, Deaton was appointed interim provost and named to the permanent position in October of that year. In 2001, his duties were expanded when he was given the additional role of executive vice chancellor for academic affairs. In 2004, Deaton was named chancellor of the University of Missouri. On June 12, 2013, Deaton announced his retirement as chancellor, effective November 15, 2013.

== Professional service ==
Deaton serves or has served on a number of state and national committees and boards. He recently served on the board of trustees of the National Foundation for Credit Counseling, a non-profit financial education organization. In 2010, he was named chairman of the board of directors for the Big 12 Conference. From 2007-2008, Deaton served on Missouri's Higher Education Funding Formula Task Force, which advised the government of Missouri on how to revamp the state's higher education funding formulas. In 2011, with an appointment from President Barack Obama, Deaton succeeded Robert Easter as chairman of the Board for International Food and Agricultural Development (BIFAD). BIFAD advises USAID on the topics of food and agriculture in developing countries. He was succeeded by Mark E. Keenum in 2018.

== Personal life ==
Deaton is married to Anne Deaton, an adjunct professor in the Department of Human Development and Family Studies at the University of Missouri and a former director of the Missouri Division of Mental Retardation and Developmental Disabilities. The Deatons have four children and seven grandchildren.

== See also ==
- History of the University of Missouri

Academic offices
Preceded by Richard L. Wallace	Chancellor of the University of Missouri; 2004–2013	Succeeded by R. Bowen Loftin
