= LSV (honor society) =

University of Missouri secret society

- Founded: 1906; 120 years ago University of Missouri
- Type: Senior society
- Affiliation: Independent
- Status: Active
- Scope: Local
- Chapters: 1
- Headquarters: Columbia, Missouri; United States

LSV is a senior women's honor society at the University of Missouri in Columbia, Missouri, United States.

== History ==
The LSV was formed in 1906 as a secret society for women students at the University of Missouri. It was revealed to the campus in February 1908. Speculation immediately began that it was the female sister-chapter to QEBH, an honor society for male students. Its founders were concerned about the status of women on campus and in society.

LSV is considered a service-based. It honors outstanding senior women and promotes and improves the status of women. Its members have public spoken out against sexual and racial injustice on campus, including criticizing the university's actions and policies.

In the mid-1960s, LSV begin taking part in the university's Tap Day ceremonies, moving away from being a secret society.

== Membership ==
LSV taps four to six women students during the spring of their junior year. The society has also tapped a handful of male members throughout its history. Members are selected based on their service to the university and community, as well as their efforts to advance the status of women. LSV also taps faculty and staff as honorary members for their contributions to the university community.

LSV member's identities remain secret until the annual Tap Day ceremony near the close of the following academic year. At this public event, LSV members remove a hood that covers their faces.

== See also ==
- Collegiate secret societies in North America
- Mystical Seven (Missouri)
