= Wat Phumin =

Buddhist temple in Nan, Thailand

Coordinates: 18°46′28.81″N 100°46′17.73″E

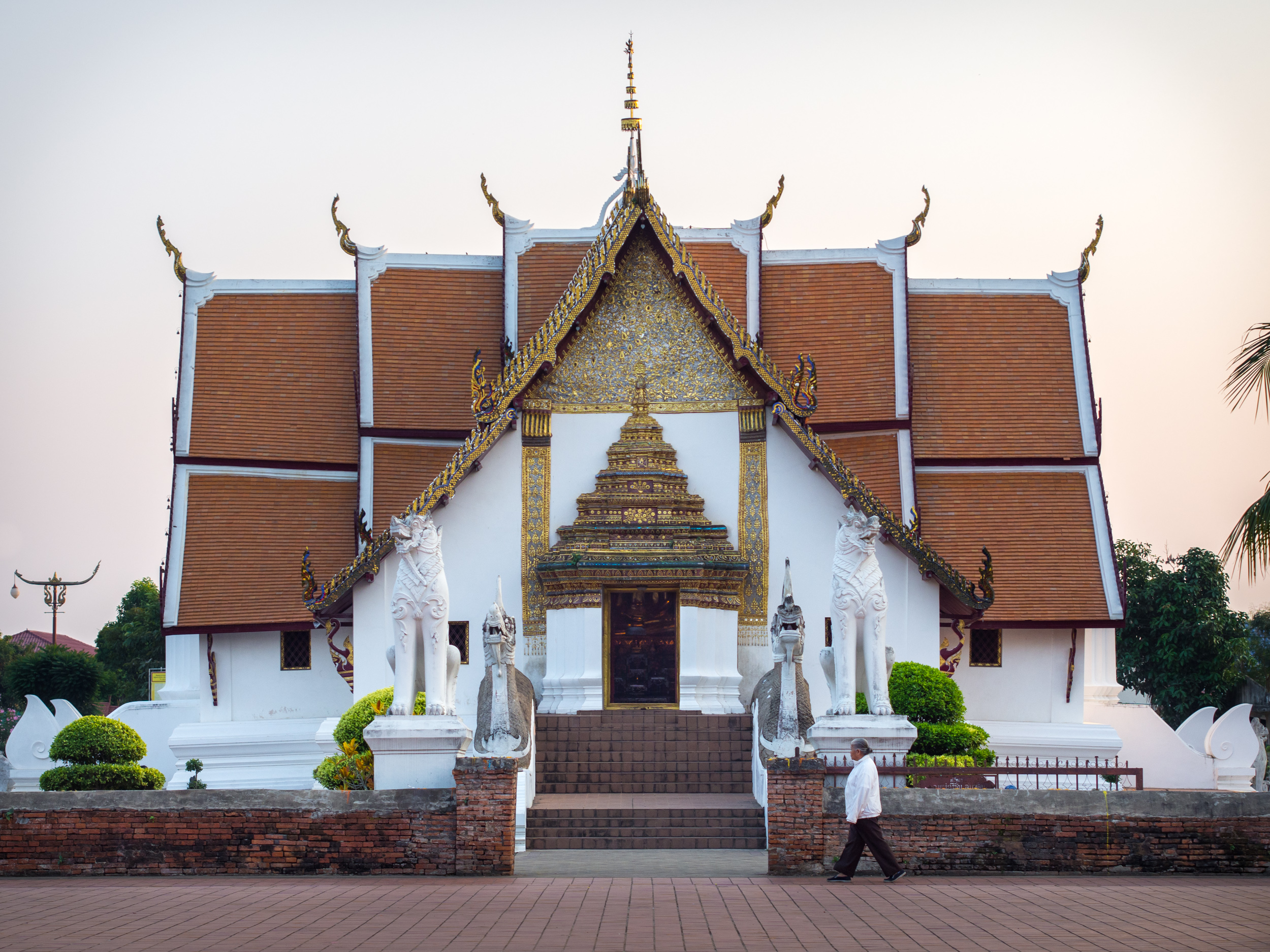
A frontal view of Wat Phumin

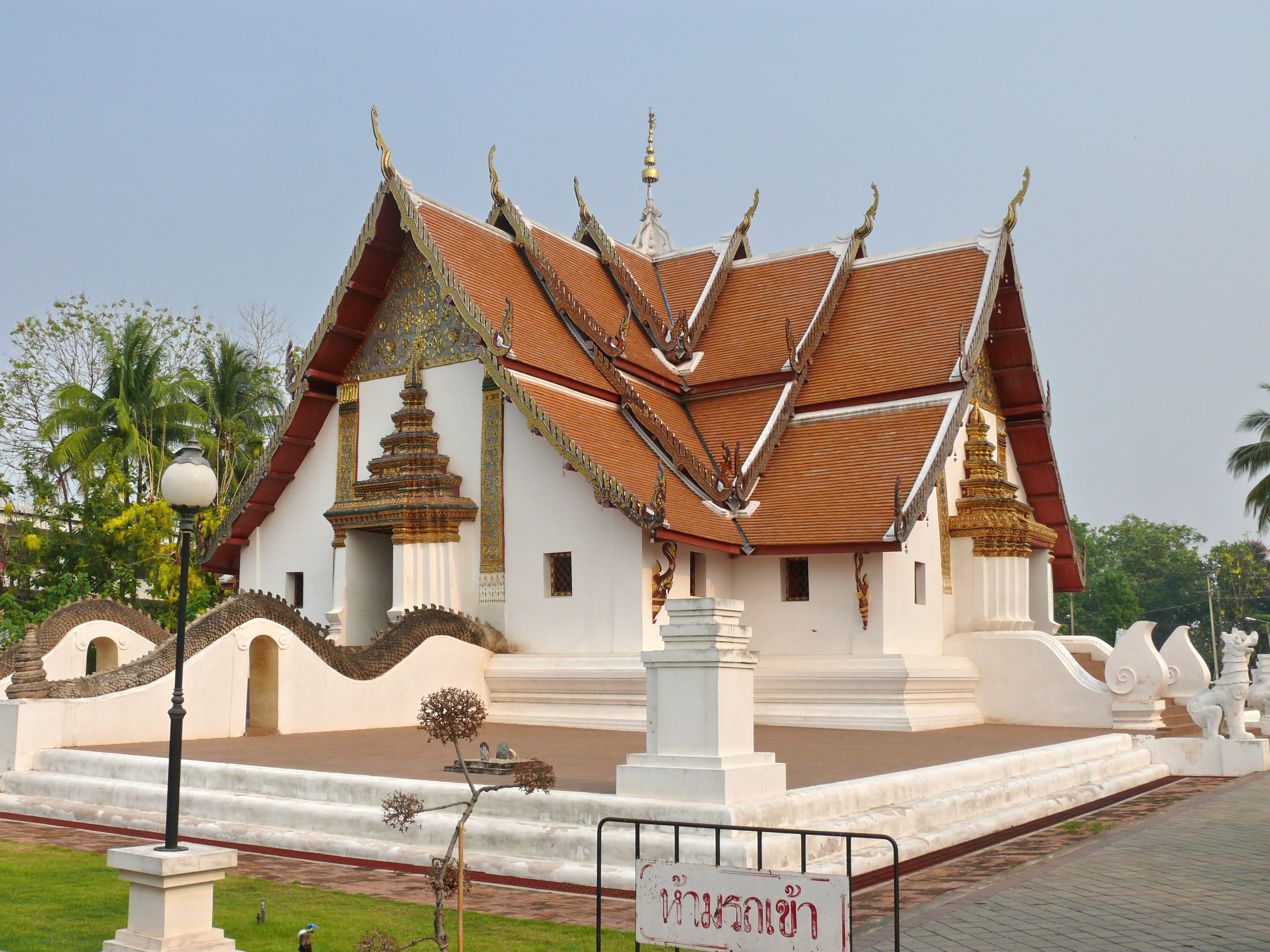
Wat Phumin seen from an angle

The city of Nan's most famous wat is renowned for its cruciform ubosot which was constructed in 1596 and restored during the reign of Phra Chao Anantaworritthidet (Chao Nakhon Nan No.62nd) (1852–1892).

== Exterior ==
It is the only temple which was built as if it were on the back of two immense snakes (or Nagas). Each of the four entrances is preceded by a small corridor topped by a finely decorated, point-shaped structure (underlining the royal origin of the temple) and is equipped with smoothly carved doors; with Chinese demon guards in the east, flowers in the north and forest life motives in the Lanna style in the west and south.

== Interior ==
The wat's interior is impressive. It is also a good example of Thai Lue architecture. The structure of the roof is supported by twelve teak pillars decorated with gold on black and red lacquer and elephants' motives. The ceiling is also finely decorated. The flowered altar resting in the center of the bôt supports four Buddhas of the Sukhothai style in the pose of Bhūmisparsa mudrā ("Buddha Invoking Mother-Earth", "Bhumi to be His Witness" or "Buddha subduing Māra" - the hand pointed down to the earth with the fingers touching the ground), facing the four directions. The shape of the ears and nose shows a Lao influence. Next to the altar one finds a splendid thammdat (a dhamma seat used by teaching monks).

== Murals ==
Well preserved murals of great value illustrating the Khattana Kumara Jataka on the Northern wall and the Nimi Jatakas on the Western wall as well as scenes of the local life of the time when they were painted by Thai Lue artists during the restoration of the temple at the end of the 19th century. Europeans can even be noticed: a reference to the arrival of the French to whom the East of the Nan valley area was yielded in 1893. The style is rather distinctive and quite removed from the traditional style of temple paintings in Thailand. They somewhat resemble the style of the murals of Wat Phra Singh in Chiang Mai and are very much like the murals of Wat Nong Bua in Tha Wang Pha District, just north of the city of Nan. The setting of the murals at Wat Phumin however, is that of the culture and everyday life of the Thai Lue people. The two most famous scenes are of greater dimensions than the majority of the other paintings: a man whispering to the ear of a woman (on the Southern side of the Western door) and the portrait painted on the side of the Southern door, which could be king Phra Chao Anantaworritthidet. The large paintings on each side of the main entrance show a Chinese influence which can be explained by the origins of the Thai Lue people.

== Gallery ==
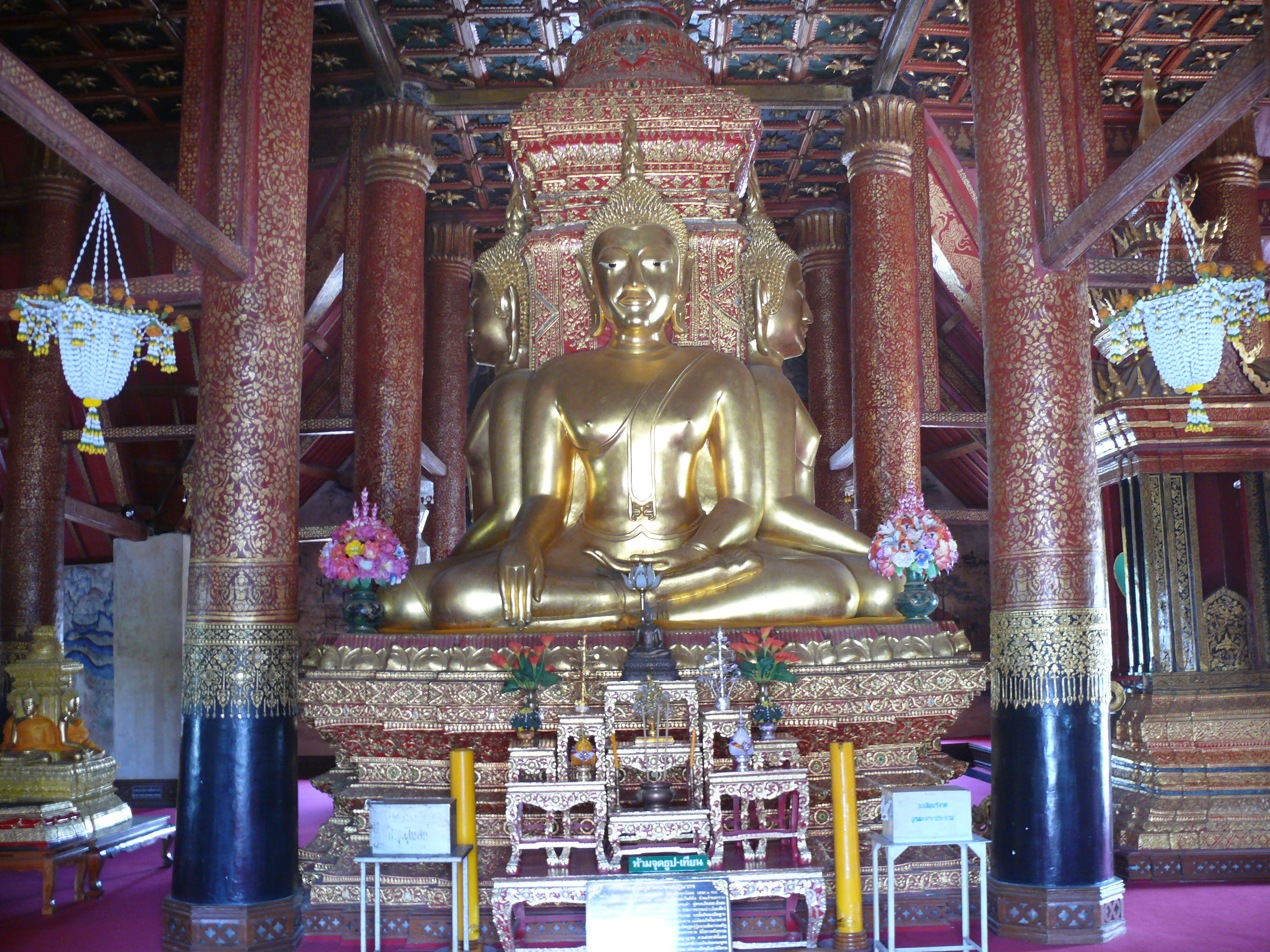
The interior of Wat Phumin

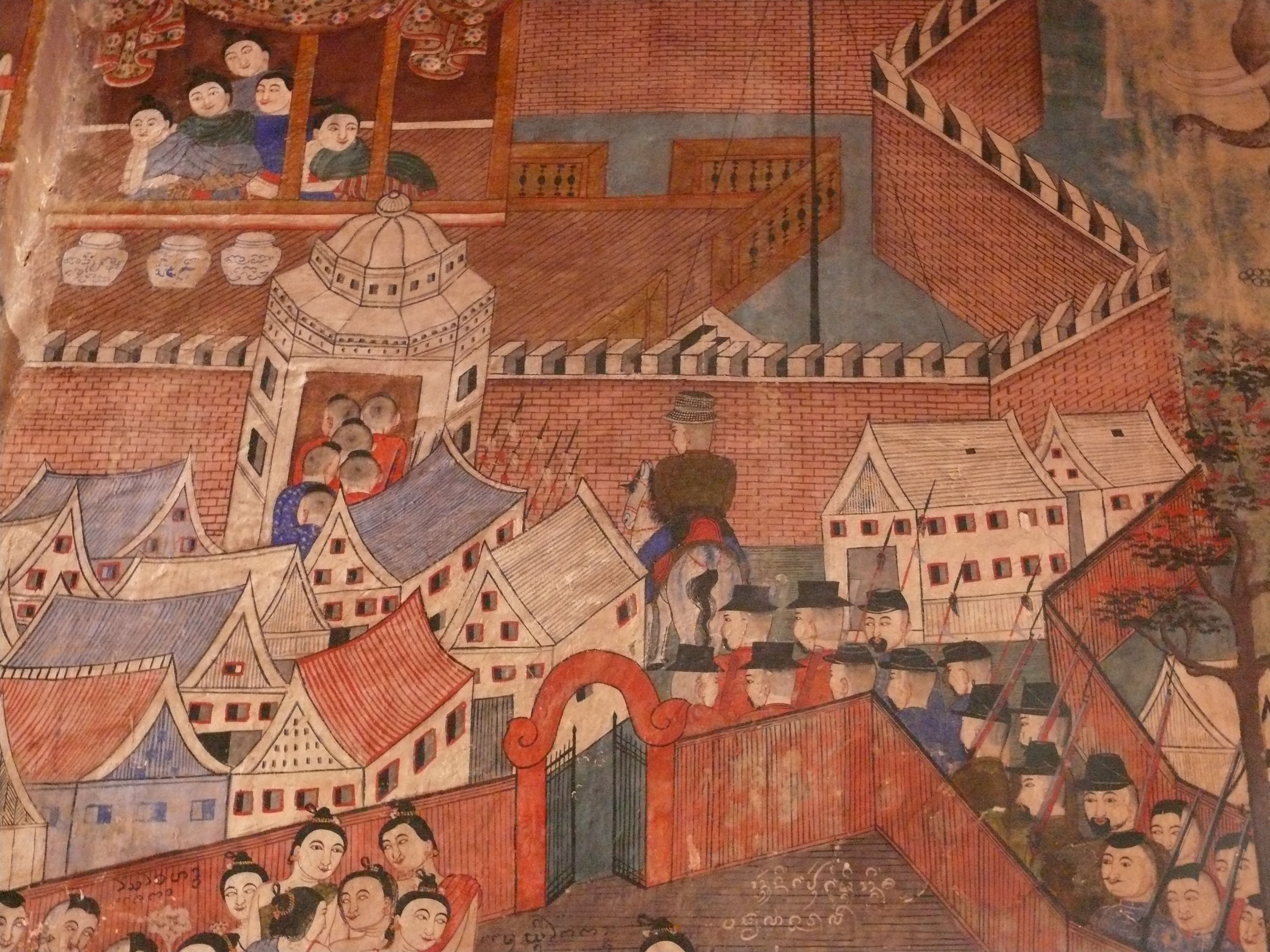
Murals at Wat Phumin showing the city and European troops

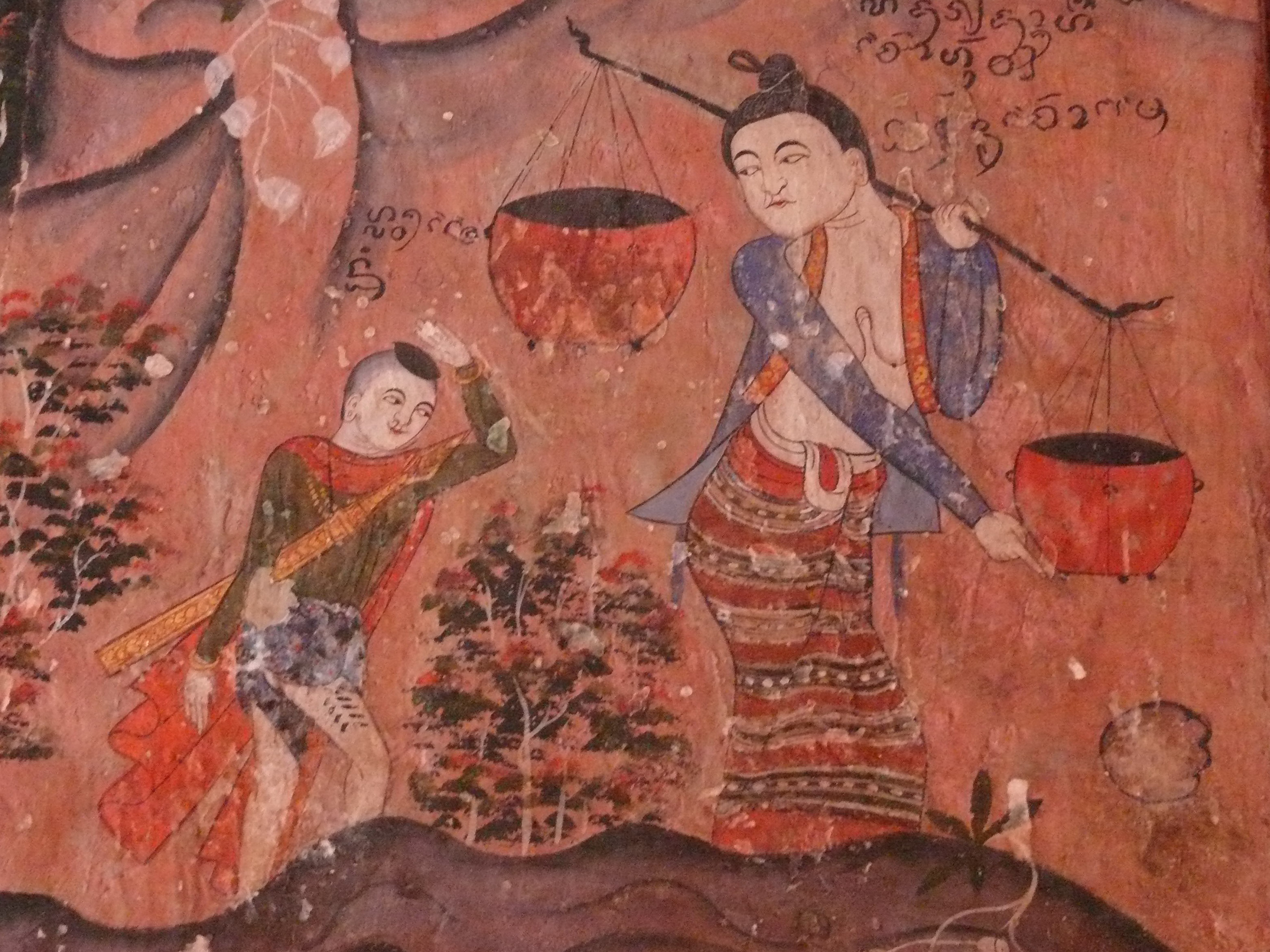
Murals at Wat Phumin (a woman and a child), Nan

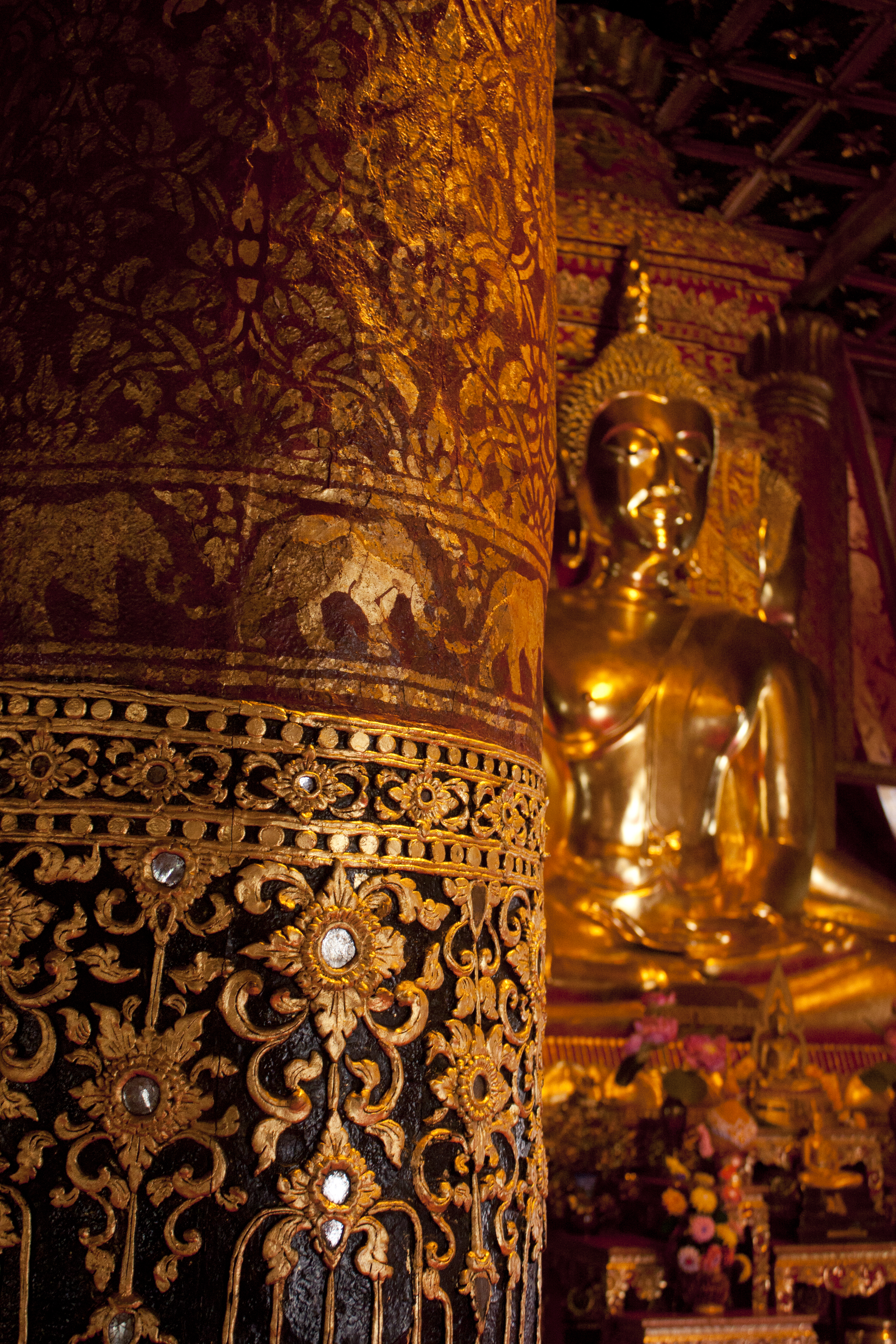
A close-up of one of the columns

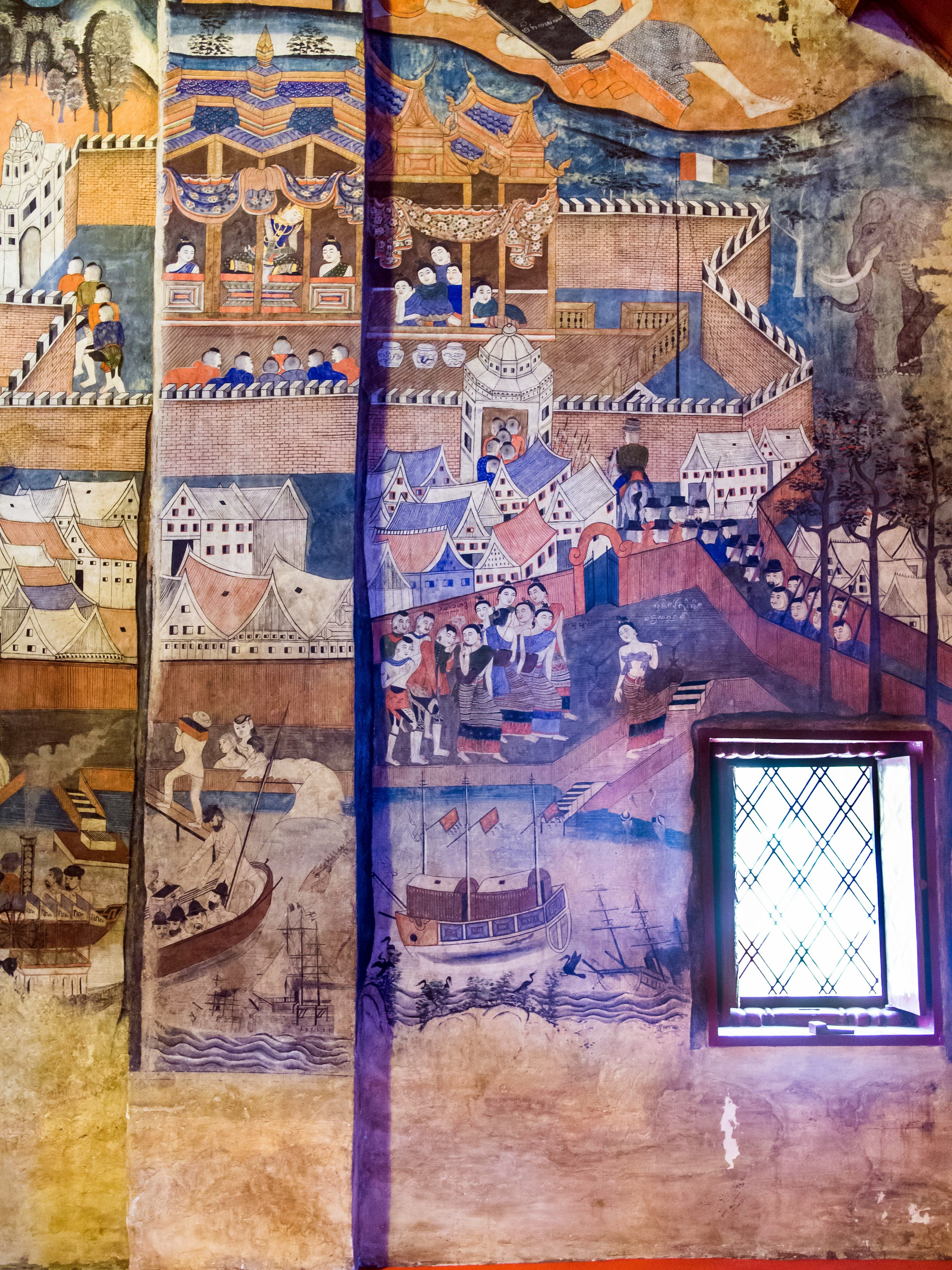
Murals showing Westerners and French warships in Bangkok during the Paknam incident of 1893
