= Seo Jung-wook =

South Korean engineer and government minister (1934–2024)

- 서정욱
- Born: November 14, 1934; Keijō, Korea, Empire of Japan
- Died: January 14, 2024 (aged 89)
- Education: Seoul National University (BS); Texas A&M University (MS, PhD); Chonnam National University (Hon. PhD, 2007)
- Occupations: Engineer, government official
- Title: Minister of Science and Technology (1999–2001)

Seo Jung-wook (Korean: 서정욱; November 14, 1934 – January 14, 2024) was a South Korean engineer and government official. He served as the Minister of Science and Technology under the Kim Dae-jung administration from 1999 to 2001.

== Education ==
Seo graduated from Seoul National University with a degree in electrical engineering. He later received his master's and doctoral degrees from Texas A&M University. In 2007, Chonnam National University awarded him an honorary doctorate in engineering.

== Career ==
Seo worked at the Agency for Defense Development (ADD), where he was involved in defense research and development. He later transitioned to the telecommunications sector, serving as the president of SK Telecom. During his tenure at SK Telecom, he worked on the commercialization of Code-division multiple access (CDMA) technology in South Korea.

In March 1999, he was appointed as the Minister of Science and Technology. He held this position until March 2001. After his ministerial term, he served in various advisory roles and as the president of Myongji University.

== Death ==
Seo died on January 14, 2024, at the age of 89.
