= Jeong Si-chae =

South Korean politician (1936–2023)

Member of the National Assembly of South Korea
- In office 11 April 1981 – 29 May 1988
- In office 30 May 1992 – 29 May 1996

Minister of Agriculture, Forestry and Fisheries
- In office 21 December 1996 – 5 August 1997
- Preceded by: Kang Woon-tae
- Succeeded by: Lee Hyo-gye

Personal details
- Born: 5 April 1936 Zenranan Province, Korea, Empire of Japan
- Died: 6 September 2023 (aged 87)
- Party: DJP; DLP
- Education: Chonnam National University (Hon. Ph.D. in Law, 2004)

Jeong Si-chae (Korean: 정시채; 5 April 1936 – 6 September 2023) was a South Korean politician. A member of the Democratic Justice Party and later the Democratic Liberal Party, he served in the National Assembly from 1981 to 1988 and again from 1992 to 1996. He was also Minister of Agriculture, Forestry and Fisheries from 1996 to 1997.

Jeong died on 6 September 2023, at the age of 87.
