= Haskell Monroe =

Haskell Moorman Monroe Jr. (March 18, 1931 – November 13, 2017) was an American educator and university administrator who led the University of Texas at El Paso from 1980 to 1987 and the University of Missouri from 1987 to 1993.

== Early life and education ==
Monroe was the only child of Haskell Moorman Monroe, Sr and Myrtle Marie Monroe (née Jackson) of Garland, Texas. The family lived in Garland, Wichita Falls, Texas, Fort Smith, Arkansas, and Orange, Texas, from 1942, where the elder Monroe was employed at Consolidated Steel Corporation shipyard.

Mornoe graduated from Orange High School in 1948. He attended Austin College in Sherman, Texas, where he was awarded both a Bachelor's and master's degrees in History. While working on his master's degree, he taught history at nearby Denison High School in Denison, Texas, and served in the United States Navy Reserve.

After earning his master's degree, he served in the United States Navy, stationed at Charleston, South Carolina. Upon muster from the navy, he continued his studies at Rice University in Houston, Texas. He completed his PhD in History in 1962.

== Academic career ==
Monroe's first teaching position was at Schreiner College in Kerrville, Texas, for the 1959 summer term. He then taught history in 1959/60 academic year at what is now Texas A&M University in College Station, Texas. During the spring term, he was offered a full-time, ongoing position at Texas A&M where he remained on the faculty until 1980. While at Texas A&M he was appointed their first Dean of Faculties. As secretary of the Aspirations Committee, he drafted the report which recommended some key changes at Texas A&M in the early 1960s – including co-education, non-compulsory Corps membership, racial integration, and high admission standards; and as Dean of Faculties was part of the 1970s administrative team which laid the basic foundations for today's Texas A&M University. His colleagues selected him for the Distinguished Achievement Award in Teaching the first year he was eligible for that honor, 1964.

In 1980, Monroe was appointed as the President of the University of Texas at El Paso, a position he held until 1987.

In 1987, Monroe moved to Missouri to be the 4th chancellor and 18th chief executive officer of the University of Missouri in Columbia, Missouri. He retired as chancellor in 1993 after receiving budget cuts from the Missouri State Legislature. After his retirement he served as a professor of history. Monroe was also editor of the "Papers of Jefferson Davis 1808-1840, Vol 1" published in 1971.

Monroe was dean of faculties emeritus at Texas A&M University until his death. He died on November 13, 2017, in College Station, Texas, at the age of 86.

== See also ==
- University of Texas at El Paso
- History of the University of Missouri

Academic offices
Preceded by Barbara Uehling	Chancellor of the University of Missouri; 1987-1993	Succeeded by Charles Kiesler
