= Charles Kiesler =

American educator, psychologist and university administrator

Charles Adolphus Kiesler (August 14, 1934 – 2002) was an American educator, psychologist and university administrator. He served as chancellor and 19th chief executive officer of the University of Missouri campus in Columbia, Missouri. He was also the founding president of the American Psychological Society (now the Association for Psychological Science) and elected to the Institute of Medicine of the National Academy of Sciences. Before becoming chancellor at the University of Missouri he was provost at Vanderbilt University and dean of the Carnegie Mellon University College of Humanities and Social Sciences. Kiesler was born in St. Louis, Missouri, and held degrees from Michigan State University and Stanford University. He died in 2002 in San Diego, California.

== See also ==
- History of the University of Missouri

Academic offices
Preceded by Haskell Monroe	Chancellor of the University of Missouri; 1993-1996	Succeeded by Richard L. Wallace
