= Shin Jeong-hoon =

South Korean politician (born 1964)

Shin Jung-hoon
- 신정훈

Chairman of the Public Administration and Security Committee
- Incumbent
- Assumed office June 2024

Member of the National Assembly
- Incumbent
- Assumed office May 30, 2020
- Constituency: Naju–Hwasun
- In office July 31, 2014 – May 29, 2016
- Constituency: Naju–Hwasun

Mayor of Naju
- In office July 1, 2002 – February 2010
- Preceded by: Kim Dae-dong
- Succeeded by: Im Seong-hun

Personal details
- Born: 6 December 1964 (age 61) Naju, Jeollanam-do, South Korea
- Party: Democratic Party of Korea
- Education: Korea University (BA in Journalism and Broadcasting); Chonnam National University (Coursework completed for MPA)

Shin Jung-hoon (Korean: 신정훈; born 6 December 1964) is a South Korean politician and former agrarian activist. He is currently a three-term member of the National Assembly representing Naju and Hwasun, and serves as the Chairman of the Public Administration and Security Committee in the 22nd National Assembly.

== Early life and education ==
Shin was born in Naju, Jeollanam-do. He graduated from Gwangju Inseong High School and earned a bachelor's degree in Journalism and Broadcasting from Korea University. He later completed the master's degree coursework in Public Administration at Chonnam National University.

== Activism ==
In 1985, as a university student, Shin participated in the occupation of the Seoul American Cultural Center, for which he was imprisoned for three years.

After his release, he returned to Naju and became a leader in the farmers' rights movement, organizing the Naju Farmers' Association. He led the "Water Tax Resistance Movement" to protest agricultural water fees, which contributed to the abolition of the tax in 2000.

== Political career ==
=== Local government ===
Shin served as a member of the Jeollanam-do Provincial Council before being elected Mayor of Naju in 2002 as an independent. During his mayoral tenure (2002–2010), he played a central role in the establishment of the Bitgaram Innovation City and the relocation of public institutions, including Korea Electric Power Corporation (KEPCO), to the region.

=== National politics ===
Shin won the Naju-Hwasun seat in the 2014 by-election. Following the 2016 election, he served as the Secretary for Agriculture and Fishery in the Blue House under the Moon Jae-in administration (2017–2018).

He was re-elected to the 21st and 22nd National Assemblies. In June 2024, he was elected as the Chairman of the Public Administration and Security Committee.

== Election results ==
=== General elections ===
Year	Elections	Constituency	Political party	Votes (%)	Results
2014	2014 By-election	Naju-Hwasun (South Jeolla)	NPAD	27,932 (62.42%)	Won
2016	20th National Assembly General Election	Naju-Hwasun (South Jeolla)	Democratic	39,246 (44.22%)	Defeated
2020	21st National Assembly General Election	Naju-Hwasun (South Jeolla)	Democratic	75,586 (78.80%)	Won
2024	22nd National Assembly General Election	Naju-Hwasun (South Jeolla)	Democratic	74,063 (71.06%)	Won

=== Local elections ===
==== Mayor of Naju ====
Year	Elections	Constituency	Political party	Votes (%)	Remarks
2002	3rd Iocal Election	Mayor of Naju	Independent	23,672 (42.55%)	Won
2006	4th Iocal Election	Mayor of Naju	Independent	29,526 (54.91%)	Won

==== Jeollanam-do Provincial Assembly ====
Year	Elections	Constituency	Political party	Votes (%)	Remarks
1995	1st Iocal Election	Naju 3rd	Independent	5,999 (45.64%)	Won
1998	2nd Iocal Election	Naju 2nd	Independent	13,423 (53.64%)	Won

== Awards ==
- Best Parliamentarian Award (NGO Monitor)
