= Choi Byung-oh =

South Korean businessman (born 1953)

- 최병오
- Born: November 18, 1953 (age 72); Busan, South Korea
- Education: Chonnam National University (Ph.D. in Philosophy, 2019)
- Occupation: Business executive
- Known for: Founding Fashion Group Hyungji and pioneering the "adult female casual" market
- Title: Founder and Chairman of Fashion Group Hyungji
- Awards: Order of Industrial Service Merit (Gold Tower, 2020)

Choi Byung-oh (Korean: 최병오; born 1953) is a South Korean entrepreneur and the founder of Fashion Group Hyungji, a major apparel conglomerate in South Korea. He is credited with establishing the "adult casual" fashion segment for middle-aged women, which significantly influenced the South Korean retail landscape.

== Early life and education ==
Choi was born in 1953 and began his career in the textile retail business in 1982. In August 2019, he was awarded an honorary doctorate in philosophy from Chonnam National University in recognition of his management philosophy and contributions to the regional economy.

== Career ==
In 1996, Choi introduced the "Crocodile Ladies" brand to the South Korean market. The brand's success led to the establishment of Hyungji Apparel in 1998, which later became Fashion Group Hyungji.

Under Choi's leadership, the group expanded through strategic acquisitions, including Woosung I&C in 2012, Hyungji Elite in 2013, and Esquire in 2015, transforming the company into a comprehensive lifestyle group. In 2021, he oversaw the relocation of the group's headquarters to the newly built Global Fashion Complex in Songdo, Incheon.
