= Chonnam National University =

National university in Gwangju, South Korea

Coordinates: 35°10′35″N 126°54′29″E

- 전남대학교
- Latin: Universitas Nationalis Chonnamensis
- Motto: 진리, 창조, 봉사
- Motto in English: Truth, Creativity, Service
- Type: National
- Established: 1952; 74 years ago
- Affiliations: KNU10, IAU
- President: Lee Keunbae (이근배)
- Faculty: 2,867 (Full-Time Equivalent 2,003)
- Administrative staff: 552
- Students: 21,595 (Full-Time Equivalent 14,778)
- Undergraduates: 16,718
- Postgraduates: 4,877
- Location: (Gwangju) 77 Yongbong-ro, Buk-gu, Gwangju 61186 / (Yeosu) 50 Daehak-ro, Yeosu, Jeonnam 59626, Gwangju and Yeosu, South Jeolla, South Korea
- Colors: Green and gold
- Mascot: Bong-hwang (Phoenix)

Korean name
- Hangul: 전남대학교
- Hanja: 全南大學校
- RR: Jeonnam daehakgyo
- MR: Chŏnnam taehakkyo

Chonnam National University (CNU; Korean: 전남대학교) is a national university located in Gwangju and South Jeolla Province, Republic of Korea. The University was founded in 1952, under the motto “Truth, Creativity and Service”, by merging five provincial colleges in South Jeolla Province and is now widely recognized as one of the Korea’s ten Flagship Korean National Universities. Following its second merger with Yosu National University in 2006, CNU has operated a specialized multi-campus system across Gwangju, Yeosu and Hwasun.

== Academics ==
University rankings
QS National	General	26–27
THE National	General	22–27
ARWU National	Research	14–18
QS Asia (Asia version)	General	=200
THE Asia (Asia version)	General	201–250
ARWU World	Research	601–700
QS World	General	901-950
THE World	General	801–1000
USNWR World	General	=844

=== Colleges ===
- College of Artificial Intelligence Convergence
- College of Agriculture & Life Sciences
- College of Arts
- College of Business Administration
- College of Education
- College of Engineering
- College of Human Ecology
- College of Humanities
- College of Law
- College of Medicine
- College of Natural Sciences
- College of Nursing
- College of Pharmacy
- College of Social Sciences
- College of Veterinary Medicine
- College of Culture & Social Sciences (Yeosu Campus)
- College of Engineering Sciences (Yeosu Campus)
- College of Fisheries & Ocean Sciences (Yeosu Campus)
- Division of Biological Sciences and Technology
- Division of Self-designed Interdisciplinary Studies
- Bachelor-master's degree program for School of Dentistry

=== Graduate programs ===
- Graduate School
- Graduate School of Business (Both English & Korean Track)
- Graduate School of Culture
- School of Dentistry
- Law School
- Medical School
- Graduate School of Education
- Graduate School of Industry and Technology
- Graduate School of Public Administration
- Graduate School of Educational & Industrial Cooperation (Yeosu Campus)
- Graduate School of Fisheries & Ocean Sciences (Yeosu Campus)

== Gallery ==
Bongji Fountain

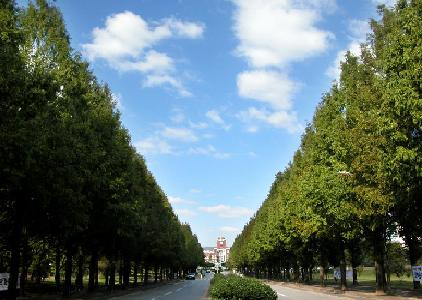
Main Gate

Yongbong Tower

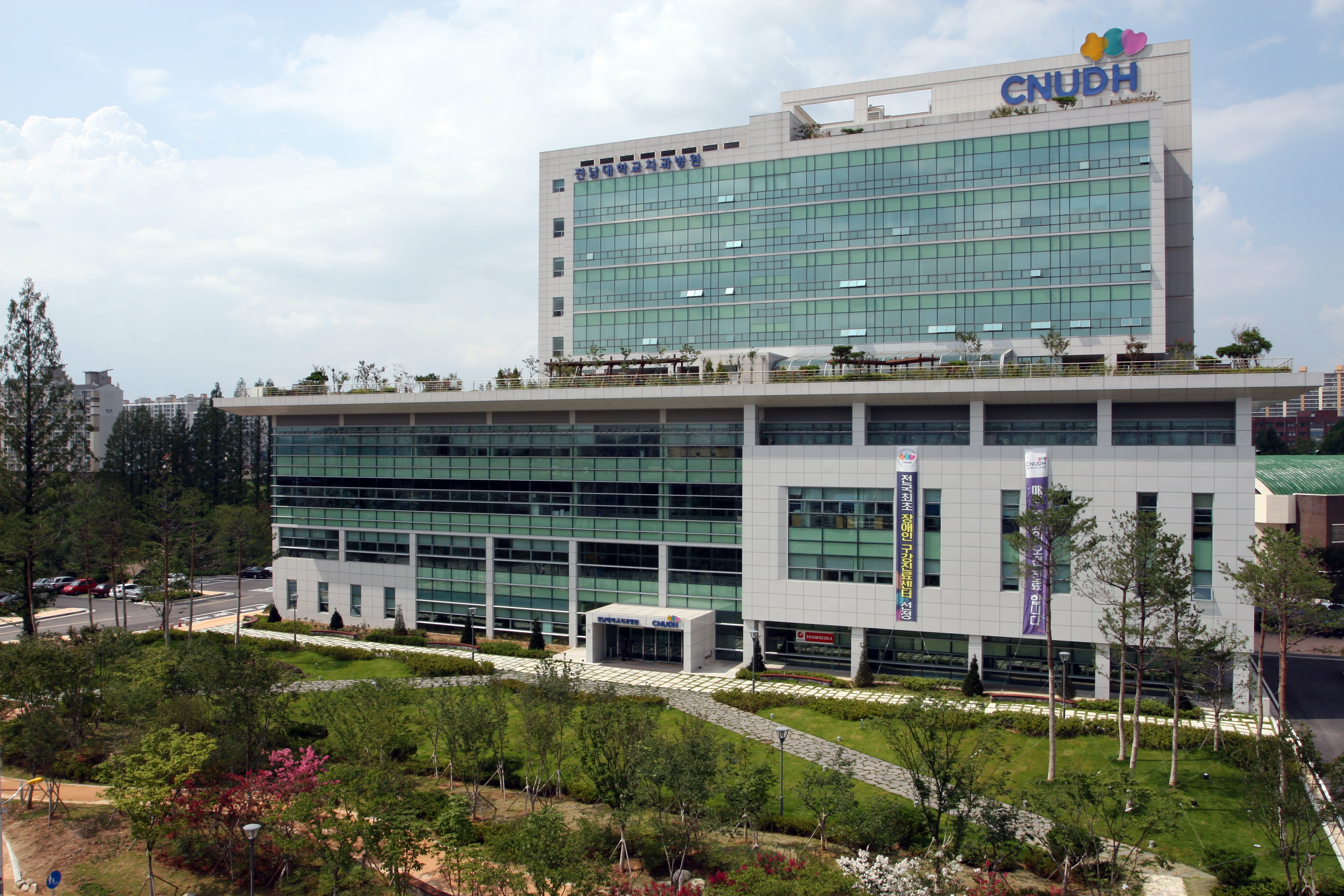
CNU Dental Hospital

Yeosu Campus Main Gate

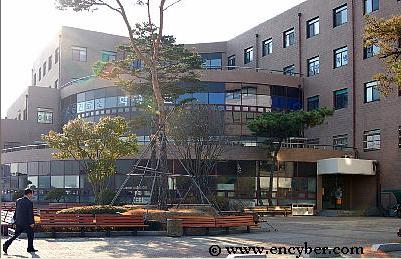
Yeosu Campus Student Union

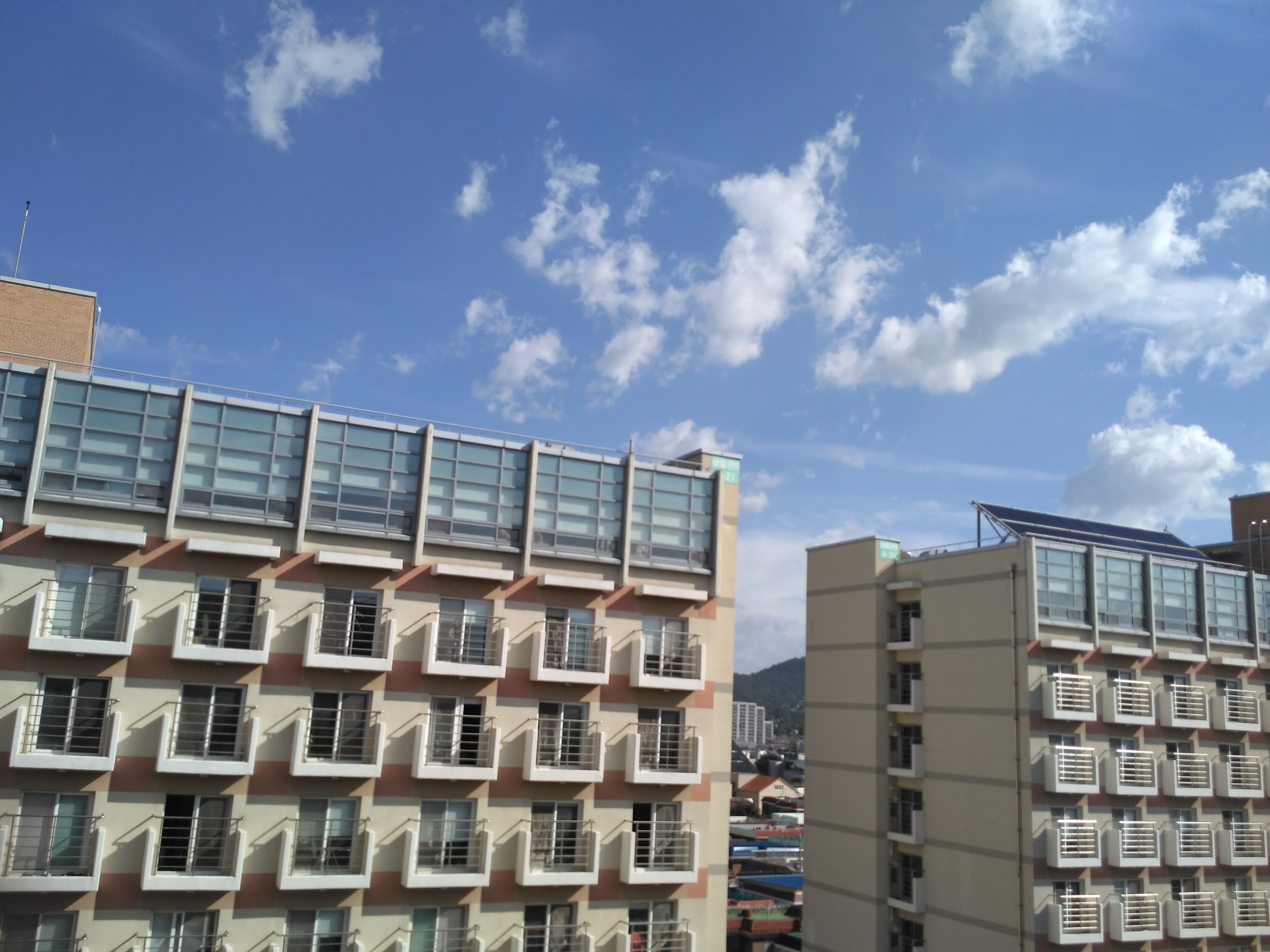
CNU Dormitory

== Notable alumni ==
=== Politics ===
- Kim Dae-jung, 8th President of South Korea and Nobel Peace Prize laureate
- Woo Won-shik, Speaker of the National Assembly (22nd)
- Chung Ui-hwa, Former Speaker of the National Assembly (19th)
- Lim Chae-jung, Former Speaker of the National Assembly (17th)
- Seo Jung-wook, 20th Minister of Science and Technology
- Lee Yong-seop, Former Mayor of Gwangju
- Chan Sarun, Former Minister of Agriculture, Forestry and Fisheries of Cambodia
- Jeong Si-chae, Former Minister of Agriculture and Forestry
- Lee Gae-ho, Member of the National Assembly
- Shin Jeong-hoon, Member of the National Assembly

=== Business ===
- Kim Woo-choong, Founder and Chairman of Daewoo Group
- James Kim (American businessman), Founder and Executive Chairman of Amkor Technology
- Kim Woong-ki, Founder and Chairman of Global Sae-A Group
- Jung Chang-sun, Founder and Chairman of Jungheung Group
- Choi Byeong-oh, Founder and Chairman of Fashion Group Hyungji
- Oh Hyung-suk, Chairman of Topsolar Group
- Park Jeong-koo, 2nd Chairman of Kumho Asiana Group
- Park Sam-koo, Former Chairman of Kumho Asiana Group
- Choi Hyun-man, Former Chairman of Mirae Asset Securities
- Lee Jin-an, President and CEO of Amkor Technology Korea

=== Academia ===
- Richard L. Wallace, Chancellor Emeritus of the University of Missouri
- Wang Shengming, Former President of Fudan University
- Brady J. Deaton, Former Chancellor of the University of Missouri
- Shirley Strum Kenny, Former President of Stony Brook University

=== Law ===
- Kim Yang-kyun, Inaugural Justice of the Constitutional Court of Korea
- Bae Man-woon, Former Justice of the Supreme Court of Korea
- Park Jae-seung, Former President of the Korean Bar Association

=== Arts ===
- Im Kwon-taek, Film director

== See also ==
- Flagship Korean National Universities
- List of national universities in South Korea
- List of universities and colleges in South Korea
- Education in Korea
