= Bae Man-woon =

South Korean judge (1934–2022)

- 배만운

Justice of the Supreme Court of Korea
- In office 11 July 1988 – 10 July 1994
- Appointed by: Roh Tae-woo

Personal details
- Born: 1934 Naju, Jeollanam-do, South Korea
- Died: May 17, 2022 (aged 87–88)
- Education: Chonnam National University (Hon. Ph.D. in Law, 2001)
- Occupation: Judge

Bae Man-woon (Note: Also known as Bae Man-un) (Korean: 배만운; 1934 – May 17, 2022) was a South Korean judge. He served as a Justice of the Supreme Court of Korea from 1988 to 1994.

== Biography ==
Bae passed the 9th High Civil Service Examination in 1957. He began his judicial career as a judge at the Gwangju District Court in 1962. In 1980, he served as a senior judge at the Seoul High Court. He later became the 6th Director of the Judicial Research and Training Institute in 1987.

In 1988, President Roh Tae-woo appointed Bae to the Supreme Court. During his six-year term, he was noted for issuing minority opinions on the National Security Act, often alongside Justice Lee Hoi-chang. In 1992, he issued an opinion stating that the National Security Act should not be interpreted in a way that infringes upon the freedom of expression. He also issued rulings regarding criminal procedure, notably declaring that interrogation protocols (suspect examination reports) drafted by prosecutors should only be valid if the suspect acknowledges their content. After retiring from the Supreme Court in 1994, he opened a private law practice.
