= Rockhurst High School =

Location
- 9301 State Line Road, Kansas City; Jackson County, Missouri 64114, USA; 38.96°N 94.606°W

Information
- Type: Private, all-male
- Motto: Ad Majorem Dei Gloriam; For the Greater Glory of God
- Established: 1910; 116 years ago
- Founder: Rev. Michael P. Dowling, SJ
- CEEB code: 261685
- President: David J. Laughlin
- Principal: Rev. Stephen Kramer, SJ
- Faculty: 80
- Grades: 9–12
- Campus type: Suburban
- Colors: Blue and white
- Fight song: "Hail Blue and White"
- Team name: Hawklets
- Rival: Shawnee Mission East Lancers; Bishop Miege Stags
- Accreditation: AdvancEd
- Publication: The Rock Collection
- Newspaper: The Prep News
- Yearbook: The Quarry
- Endowment: $20 million
- Tuition: $15,425 (2021-2022)
- Affiliation: Catholic, Jesuit
- Website: RockhurstHS

Rockhurst High School is a private, Jesuit, all-boys preparatory school founded in 1910 along with Rockhurst College in Kansas City, Missouri, United States. It moved away from the college in 1962 to a campus on State Line Road in Kansas City.

Rockhurst is accredited by the North Central Education Association and is a member of the North Central Education Association of Independent College Preparatory Schools, the Jesuit Secondary Education Association, and the National Association for College Admission Counseling (and its regional affiliates).

== History ==
In 1908, the Michael P. Dowling, S.J., selected the site for a Jesuit school at 52nd and Troost Street in Kansas City. The name "Rockhurst" was chosen because large rocks found on the grounds resembled those at the Jesuit Stonyhurst College in Lancashire, England. Rockhurst was established by the Society of Jesus and chartered by the State of Missouri as part of Rockhurst College in August 1910. Classes began in the fall of 1914, and the school changed its name to Rockhurst High School in 1923. The high school shared a campus and corporate umbrella with the college until 1962, when it moved to the Greenlease Campus (named for its principal benefactor, Robert C. Greenlease).

In 2017 Fr. Terrence Baum, S.J., concluded 12 years as president of the high school. He had overseen a $41.3 million fund-raising campaign which allowed capital improvements including Loyola Center athletic complex, a dining commons, and interactive classrooms. In 2018, former Rockhurst High School principal David J. Laughlin returned to be the school's first lay president.

== Academics ==
Fifty-six semester credits are required for graduation. This includes four years of English, of mathematics and computer programming, and of theology; three years of social studies and of physical science; two years of modern and classical languages; one semester of communication arts and another of communications arts or visual and performing arts; and a semester of computer education and of physical education. To this are added 12 semesters of college-preparatory electives.

Beginning in 2017 Rockhurst adopted a STEAM program method for instruction in the sciences.

== Spiritual retreat program ==
All freshmen participate in a two-and-a-half day retreat experience focused on community and love of God, with the diverse members of the Rockhurst community as presenters. All sophomores participate in a day of reflection on how they are realizing God's hopes for them, followed by a conversation on the same topic with their parents, a member of the Rockhurst staff being present as facilitator. All juniors make one of the three and a half-day Kairos retreats. Focus is on Christ working in their lives; Talks by Rockhurst student leaders and adults stimulate group discussions and private reflection. Seniors are offered options of making three-day retreats based on Ignatius' Spiritual Exercises and two-day camping retreats with a focus on finding God in nature. Neither is required but both may be made more than once.

== Service to others ==
All students participate in the school's voluntary service program throughout their four years. Freshmen are introduced to voluntary service during freshman orientation days, again during their retreat, and at one of the special freshman service days. In sophomore and junior years each student puts in at least 40 hours performing some corporal work of mercy. Seniors spend three weeks on a senior project of their choice, working with people who have special needs.

Beyond the required service hours, Rockhurst has additional projects which students take on in a program named after Jesuit Father General Pedro Arrupe, who called on Jesuit schools to educate men and women for others. This includes the Joseph of Arimathea Society, Snowmen for Others, For the Greater (Morning) Glory, Hurtado’s Mentors, Claver Homeless Ministry, Friends of L'Arche, and Upper Room Tutors.

The Total Ignatian Experience program provides the whole Rockhurst community, including parents, with opportunities for immersion experiences in summers; seniors may also do this during their January service experience. Programs offered are in Kansas City, St. Louis, Appalachia, Tijuana, and Guatemala. Running the Harvest Food Drive and Mission Week are also a part of this program.

The Jesuit Alumni Service Corps (ASC) involves graduates of Jesuit schools in a year of teaching at a Jesuit secondary school. Eleven Rockhurst High School graduates have served in ASC and in 2016 there were 16 former ASC members on the Rockhurst faculty.

== Programs and awards ==
Rockhurst offers to students 61 extracurricular clubs and activities. Primary among these are the drama, choral, and instrumental music programs which are meant to supplement the required semester in a fine or performing arts class. The school choir has performed in concert at the Jesuit parish in town.

From the student government organization, one of the more prominent student body presidents was Tim Kaine, class of '76, Hillary Clinton's running mate in the US presidential election of 2016. In 2016 eight students in the Mock Trial Club took second place in the state.

Prior to admittance, the Alberto Hurtado Scholars Program offers a year-round educational enrichment program for boys in grades 6-8 who are very capable but have not had the educational opportunities to prepare them for the Rockhurst admissions test.

Recognition given for student achievement includes the following annual awards. There are awards in each academic discipline. Students are inducted into the National Honor Society. The Environmental Leadership Award is given to students who have excelled in this area. Perfect and exemplary attendance awards are given. There are numerous awards of distinction: Advanced Placement Scholars; National Merit Commended, Semi-Finalists and Finalists; National Achievement Scholarship Program; National Hispanic Recognition; and book awards sponsored by universities. R Awards are conferred on students who show exemplary generosity in building up the RHS community. And 28 students in 2016 had put in over 100 hours of service and received the President's Volunteer Service Award. One senior is voted by classmates to receive the Senior Class Award, for service to the school. On the same basis the Carl G. Kloster, S.J., “Special R” Award is voted on by faculty and staff, who also bestow the Jesuit Secondary Education Association Award on the basis of Christian and Ignatian ideals.

In 2013 the school initiated a drug testing program. Only a few students tested positive, and their parents were informed. Upon a second instance the school becomes involved.

== Athletics ==
Rockhurst is classified as a Class 6A school by the Missouri State High School Activities Association, meaning that it competes against the largest high schools in Missouri during state competition.

=== State championships ===
MSHSAA's classification nomenclature has changed over time and often has varied by sport, so many of the titles listed below were won in divisions known by different names, i.e. Class 3, Class 5A, etc.; however, each title falls under the Class 6A designation either by name or by the criteria outlined by MSHSAA at the time the title was won. Rockhurst has won 75 titles as of 2017.

- Basketball: 2013, 1989, 1987, 1932
- Cross country: 2024, 2018, 2016
- Football: 2010, 2007, 2002, 2000, 1987, 1986, 1983, 1981, 1971
- Golf: 2022, 2017, 2012, 2010, 2009, 2008, 2006, 2005, 2000, 1999, 1998, 1991, 1984, 1976, 1974
- Hockey: (MAHSHL) (Note: The MAHSHL replaced the KCMAHSHL beginning in 2009) 2013, 2009
- Lacrosse: (MSLA, LAKC) 2024, 2023, 2022, 2021, 2017, 2014, 2011, 2010, 2008, 2006, 2003
- Soccer: 2023, 2022, 2021, 2017, 2013, 2010, 2008, 2007, 1999, 1998
- Swim and Dive: 2023, 2022, 2021, 2020, 2014, 2013, 2012, 2011, 2010, 2009, 2008, 2007, 2006, 2006, (Note: Swimming changed from a winter sport to a fall sport in 2006; thus, there were two championships in that calendar year.) 2005
- Tennis: 2015, 2014, 2013, 2009, 2007, 2005, 2004, 2003, 2002, 2001, 2000, 1999, 1998, 1997, 1996, 1983, 1976, 1975
- Track and field: 2026, 2025, 1976, 1975

Rockhurst won 35 state championships in the decade beginning in 2005, and six state championships in 2008-2009 alone. Its record for placings in a single year is 2007, with seven. Also, in 1987 Rockhurst became the only institution in the history of Missouri high school athletics to win football and basketball state championships in the same year. Rockhurst's athletics program was named by Sports Illustrated as the best in Missouri and one of the top ten in the country in 2009. In 2012 MaxPreps ranked the school's football team as having been the most consistently highly ranked state team since 2004. In 2016 and again in 2023, Rockhurst's soccer team reached the number one ranking in the nation. The 2023 team finished as national champions.

Rockhurst is not affiliated with any local high school athletic conferences, and because it is not a public school its student make-up is not geographically restricted. Its biggest rivals in the Kansas City area are Shawnee Mission East, Bishop Miege, Blue Springs High School and Blue Springs South High School.

=== Program-specific accomplishments ===
==== Football ====
Rockhurst is the only school to win a championship in each major state championship venue: Busch Stadium, Arrowhead Stadium, the University of Missouri's Faurot Field, and the Edward Jones Dome. It also won a championship in a "non-championship" venue: its first championship, in 1971, at William Chrisman High School, against St. Louis (MO) Beaumont. Its nine football championships rank the school fourth in Missouri history, behind Jefferson City High School which has 10, Valle Catholic High School, which has 12, and Webb City High School which has 16. The team has been to 14 state championships, second only to Webb City, which has been to 19 championship games, and it is the all-time leader in state playoff appearances and state playoff wins. Five Rockhurst teams have won the state championship with perfect records: 1971, 2000, 2002, 2007, and 2010. The 2000, 2002, 2007, and 2010 teams finished the season nationally ranked 14th, 6th, 20th, and 19th respectively (after finishing 14–0, 13–0, 13–0, and 14–0). The back-to-back state championship teams of 1986 and 1987 also finished nationally ranked, 14th and 13th respectively (after finishing 11–1 and 12–1).

The last three head coaches of Rockhurst's football team, Al Davis Jr., Jerry Culver, and Tony Severino, are all members of Missouri's High School Coaches Hall of Fame, and all won state championships. Davis was a two-time recipient of the Knute Rockne Award and Severino was named USA Today's National Coach of the Year in 2000.

== Notable alumni ==
Arts, entertainment, and media

- Robert Altman, filmmaker (did not graduate)
- Kenneth Atchity, film producer and author
- Jim Bannon, actor best remembered as the fourth cinema Red Ryder
- Jeff East, actor
- Nick Griffin, comedian
- James V. Grimaldi, Pulitzer Prize-winning journalist
- Edward Kerr, actor
- Rich "Lowtax" Kyanka, operator of humor website Something Awful
- Sean Plott, e-sports commentator and former professional Starcraft II player
- Nick Plott, e-sports commentator of Starcraft II based in Korea
- Jason Sudeikis, writer/performer on Saturday Night Live (attended, but graduated from Shawnee Mission West High School)
- Spencer Tracy, Oscar-winning film actor (did not graduate)
- Kevin Wall, nationally known radio talk show host

Athletics

- Tony Blevins, former NFL cornerback for the San Francisco 49ers and Indianapolis Colts
- Brad Budde, former NFL offensive guard for USC and the Kansas City Chiefs
- David Cone, All-Star Major League Baseball player and broadcaster. Winner of the 1994 Cy Young Award
- John Cooper, head basketball coach, Miami (Ohio)
- Alex George, former MLB player (Kansas City Athletics)
- Jim Gleeson, former MLB baseball player for Cleveland Indians (1936) Chicago Cubs (1939–1940) Cincinnati Reds (1941–1942), coached for the New York Yankees
- John Michael Gyllenborg, college football tight end for the Wyoming Cowboys
- Charlie Heck, NFL offensive tackle for the Houston Texans
- Cashius Howell, NFL defensive end for the Cincinnati Bengals
- Will John, professional soccer player for Randers FC in Denmark
- Ken Klee, NHL defenseman for the New Jersey Devils (did not graduate)
- John Mayberry, Jr., former major league baseball player for the Philadelphia Phillies, Toronto Blue Jays, and New York Mets
- John McCambridge, former NFL linemen for Detroit Lions (1967)
- Dexter McDonald, NFL cornerback for the Oakland Raiders
- Paul Migliazzo, former NFL linebacker for the Chicago Bears
- Steve Mingori, former MLB baseball player for the Cleveland Indians and Kansas City Royals
- Kenyon Rasheed, former NFL running back for the New York Giants
- Ryan Raybould, former professional soccer player for the Kansas City Wizards
- Kerry Reardon, NFL defensive player for the Kansas City Chiefs
- Timothy Thomas Ryan, NFL offensive lineman for Notre Dame and the Tampa Bay Buccaneers
- Nathan Scheelhaase, former quarterback for Illinois 2010-2013
- Seth Sinovic, former professional soccer player for Sporting Kansas City and New England Revolution
- Andrew Sprague, college football offensive lineman for the Michigan Wolverines
- Bill Whitaker, former NFL defensive back for the Green Bay Packers and St. Louis Cardinals
- Jordan Willis, NFL defensive end for the San Francisco 49ers

Business

- Walter McCormick, President and CEO of United States Telecom Association
- Scott Tucker, felon, ex-businessman

Education

- Clarence H. Miller, professor and author
- Walter Ong, S.J., philosopher
- Michael R. Strain, economist and writer

Medicine

- Joseph Waeckerle, on-field doctor for the Kansas City Chiefs and medical director of the rescue at the Hyatt Regency walkway collapse

Politics and law

- Joseph Barloon, U.S. deputy trade representative
- Herbert Harris, former member of the United States House of Representatives
- Josh Hawley, former Missouri Attorney General and United States senator
- Tim Kaine, 2016 U.S. Democratic vice-presidential nominee, U.S. Senator and former Governor of Virginia and Chairman of the Democratic National Committee
- Sean Pouche, member of the Missouri House of Representatives
- Joseph P. Teasdale, former Governor of Missouri
