= Park Sam-koo =

South Korean businessman (born 1945)

Park Sam-koo (Korean: 박삼구; born March 19, 1945) is a South Korean businessman who served as the chairman of Kumho Asiana Group, a large South Korean chaebol.

In 2004, he was awarded an honorary doctorate in business administration from Chonnam National University for his contribution to regional economic development.

He resigned from all posts in March 2019 following accounting issues at Asiana Airlines and the controversial "no-meal fiasco" on flights.

In August 2022, Park was sentenced to 10 years in prison for embezzlement and breach of trust regarding unfair inter-affiliate trading to support his control over the group.
