= Richard L. Wallace =

Richard Lee Wallace

Chancellor of the University of Missouri
- In office 1997–2004

Personal details
- Born: February 27, 1936 (age 89) Columbia, Missouri, U.S.
- Education: Northwestern University (BA, MA); Vanderbilt University (PhD); Chonnam National University (Hon. PhD in Philosophy, 2000)
- Occupation: Educator

Richard Lee Wallace (born February 27, 1936) is an American educator and former chancellor of the University of Missouri in Columbia, Missouri.

He is the 20th chief executive officer of the Columbia campus and sixth since the creation of the University of Missouri System. Wallace holds bachelor's and master's degrees from Northwestern University and a doctorate in economics from Vanderbilt University. In addition to holding the position of chancellor Wallace served on the board of directors for both the Big 12 Conference and the NCAA Division-I Committee on Athletic Certification. He was named Chancellor Emeritus of the University of Missouri upon his retirement

== See also ==
- History of the University of Missouri

Academic offices
Preceded by Charles Kiesler	Chancellor of the University of Missouri; 1997-2004	Succeeded by Brady J. Deaton
