= Nan, Thailand =

Nan น่าน ᨶᩣ᩠᩵ᨶ
- Town Municipality
- Nan Municipality เทศบาลเมืองน่าน ᨾᩮᩬᩥᨦᨶᩣ᩠᩵ᨶ
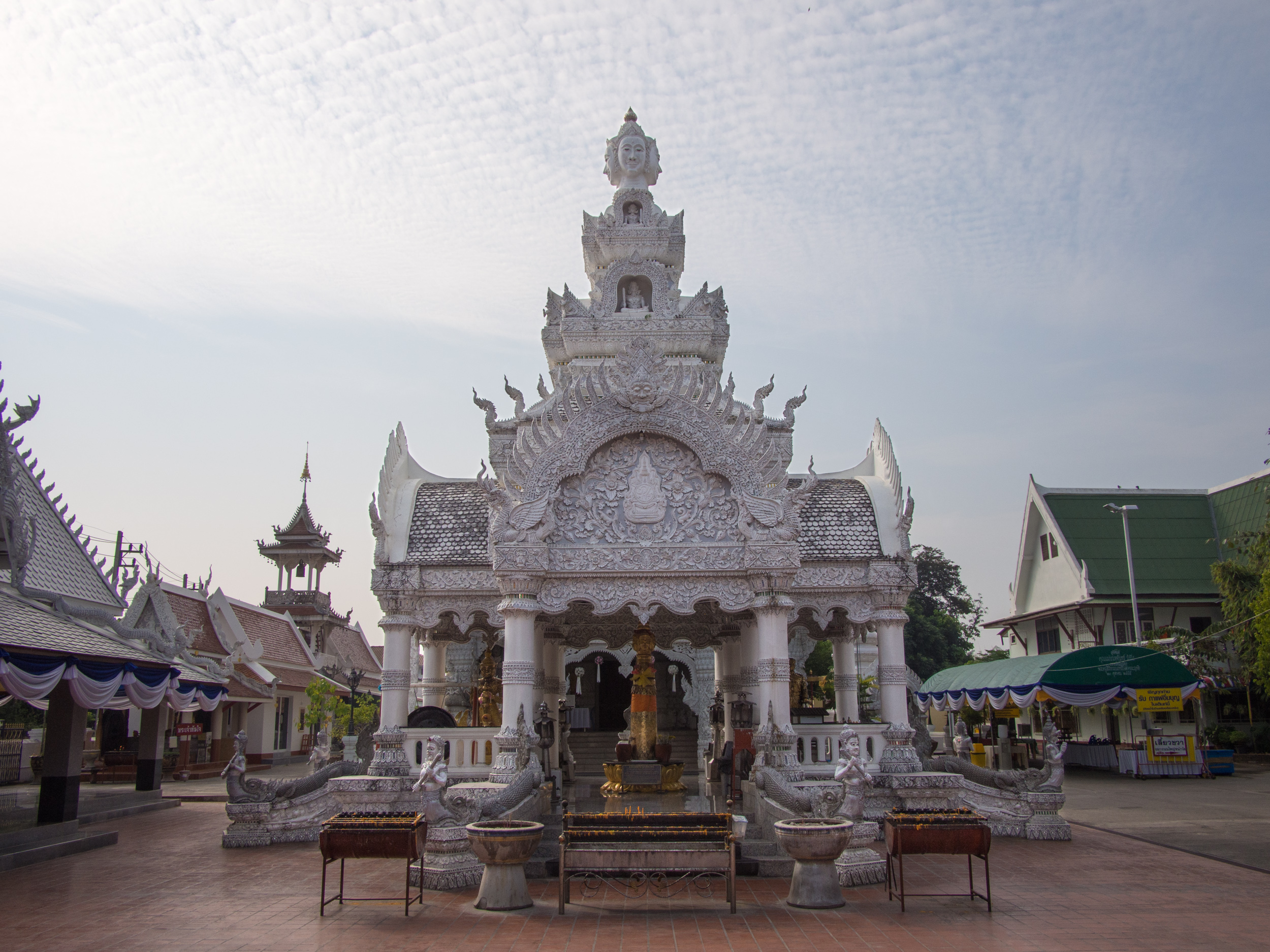
- City pillar shrine, Nan, Wat Ming Mueang

- Location in Northern Thailand
- Coordinates: 18°47′N 100°47′E
- Country: Thailand
- Province: Nan
- District: Mueang Nan

Government
  - Type: Municipality
  - Mayor: Surapol Thiansut

Area
  - Total: 7.6 km^{2} (2.9 sq mi)
- Elevation: 211 m (692 ft)

Population (2024)
  - Total: 18,357
  - Density: 2,633.16/km^{2} (6,819.9/sq mi)
- Time zone: UTC+7 (ICT)
- Area code: (+66) 54
- Website: www.nancity.go.th

Nan (Northern Thai: ᨶᩣ᩠᩵ᨶ; Thai: น่าน, pronounced [nâːn]) is a town in northern Thailand. It is 688 km (428 mi) north of Bangkok. It is in the centre of Nan province which bears its name, and of which it is the former administrative capital. It covers tambon Nai Wiang and parts of tambon Pha Sing of Mueang Nan district, an area of 7.60 km^{2} (2.93 sq mi) divided into 30 chumchon. In 2010 it had a population of 21,333 spread along the Nan River's right bank. Nan is a small city, primarily devoted to commercial, administrative, educational, and hospital activities. The old heart of the city, where Wat Phumin, the national museum and other tourist attractions are found, is being restored.

Nan, Thailand
- "Nan" in Thai language (top) and Northern Thai with Tai Tham script (bottom)

Thai name
- Thai: น่าน
- RTGS: Nan

Northern Thai name
- Northern Thai: ᨶᩣ᩠᩵ᨶ (Nan)

== Geography ==
Nan City is situated in the Nan River basin at an elevation of 204 meters (699 feet). The city is located on the right (west) bank of the Nan River and consists largely of river plains surrounded by mountains.

== History ==
Nan, for centuries, was separate as the Nan Kingdom, with few relationships with the outside world. There is evidence of prehistoric habitation, but it wasn't until several small mueang united to form Nanthaburi on the Nan River in the mid-14th century, contemporaneously with the creation of Luang Prabang and the Lan Xang (Million Elephants) kingdom in Laos, that the city became notable. Associated with the Sukhothai Kingdom, the mueang took the title Wara Nakhon and played a significant part in the development of early Thai nationalism.

By the end of the 14th century Nan was one of the nine northern Thai-Lao principalities that formed Lanna. The city-state flourished throughout the 15th century under the name Chiang Klang ('middle city'), a reference to its position roughly midway between Chiang Mai ('new city') and Chiang Thong ('golden city'), today's Luang Prabang).

The Burmese took control of the kingdom in 1558 and deported many of the inhabitants to Burma as slaves; the city was deserted until northern Thailand was retaken from the Burmese in 1786. The local dynasty then regained local sovereignty and it remained semi-autonomous until 1931 when Nan finally accepted full Bangkok dominion. Part of its territory had been annexed to Laos by the French in the late-19th century.

Parts of the old city wall and several early wats dating from the Lanna period can be seen in contemporary Nan. The city's wats are distinctive; some temple structures show Lanna influence, while others belong to the Thai Lue legacy brought from Xishuangbanna in China, where the Thai Lue people originated.

== Climate ==
The climate is characterized by hot and humid summers and cool winters. It is influenced by the southwest monsoon, bringing moisture and heavy rainfall from May to September. The northeast monsoon brings cooler temperatures from October to February, while the southeast monsoon brings hot weather from March to April. The surrounding topography consists of valleys and steep mountains, with mountain ranges running north-south. This north-south orientation allows the mountaintops to fully absorb high-pressure systems from China during winter. Conversely, the north-south orientation acts as a barrier against easterly monsoons. Furthermore, there is a significant difference in elevation between mountaintops and sea level. These factors result in very hot daytime temperatures and cool nighttime temperatures due to downdrafts from the mountain winds into the valleys.

Climate data for Nan (1991–2020, extremes 1951-present)
Month	Jan	Feb	Mar	Apr	May	Jun	Jul	Aug	Sep	Oct	Nov	Dec	Year
Record high °C (°F)	36.8 (98.2)	38.8 (101.8)	41.8 (107.2)	44.1 (111.4)	42.5 (108.5)	40.3 (104.5)	38.0 (100.4)	38.4 (101.1)	36.3 (97.3)	36.6 (97.9)	36.7 (98.1)	35.3 (95.5)	44.1 (111.4)
Mean daily maximum °C (°F)	30.8 (87.4)	33.6 (92.5)	36.3 (97.3)	37.0 (98.6)	35.5 (95.9)	34.0 (93.2)	32.7 (90.9)	32.2 (90.0)	32.9 (91.2)	32.8 (91.0)	31.8 (89.2)	30.1 (86.2)	33.3 (92.0)
Daily mean °C (°F)	21.8 (71.2)	23.9 (75.0)	27.1 (80.8)	29.1 (84.4)	29.0 (84.2)	28.7 (83.7)	27.9 (82.2)	27.4 (81.3)	27.4 (81.3)	26.7 (80.1)	24.5 (76.1)	21.8 (71.2)	26.3 (79.3)
Mean daily minimum °C (°F)	14.9 (58.8)	16.1 (61.0)	19.4 (66.9)	22.6 (72.7)	24.0 (75.2)	24.4 (75.9)	24.2 (75.6)	23.9 (75.0)	23.7 (74.7)	22.3 (72.1)	19.1 (66.4)	15.5 (59.9)	20.8 (69.5)
Record low °C (°F)	3.5 (38.3)	7.0 (44.6)	9.1 (48.4)	16.2 (61.2)	18.5 (65.3)	20.1 (68.2)	19.6 (67.3)	19.4 (66.9)	19.4 (66.9)	13.4 (56.1)	6.2 (43.2)	2.7 (36.9)	2.7 (36.9)
Average precipitation mm (inches)	14.3 (0.56)	8.8 (0.35)	38.7 (1.52)	98.0 (3.86)	170.2 (6.70)	134.8 (5.31)	213.3 (8.40)	291.5 (11.48)	206.2 (8.12)	59.8 (2.35)	15.8 (0.62)	12.1 (0.48)	1,263.5 (49.74)
Average precipitation days (≥ 1.0 mm)	1.3	0.8	3.2	6.7	11.3	11.5	15.1	17.9	13.9	6.9	1.4	0.8	90.8
Average relative humidity (%)	75.8	69.0	64.7	67.6	74.7	78.3	81.5	84.4	84.0	81.3	78.8	77.4	76.5
Mean monthly sunshine hours	272.8	257.1	294.5	243.0	198.4	156.0	120.9	117.8	144.0	201.5	216.0	254.2	2,476.2
Mean daily sunshine hours	8.8	9.1	9.5	8.1	6.4	5.2	3.9	3.8	4.8	6.5	7.2	8.2	6.8
Source 1: World Meteorological Organization Feb–May record highs and lows 1951–2022;
Source 2: Office of Water Management and Hydrology, Royal Irrigation Department (sun 1981–2010)(extremes)

== Culture ==
Wat Phumin is the city's most well-known wat. It is located near the Nan National Museum. The fifteenth century Wat Phra That Khao Noi overlooks the city and the golden Phra Buddha Maha Udom Mongkhon Nanthaburi, Sri Nan is enshrined there. The city has a lak muang (city pillar), Wat Ming Mueang, at the center of the city.

== Gallery ==
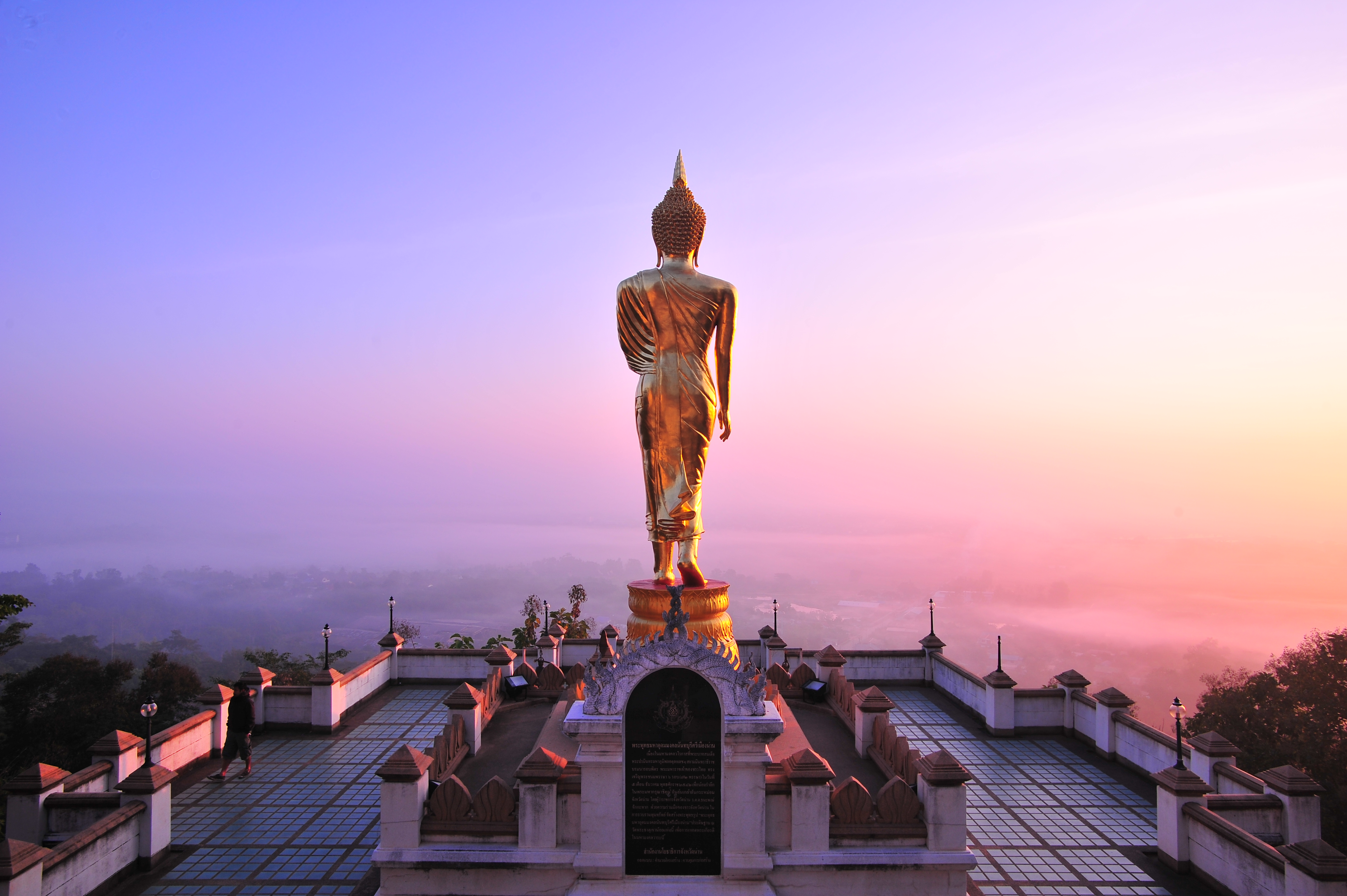
The standing Buddha of Wat Phra That Khao Noi overlooks Nan

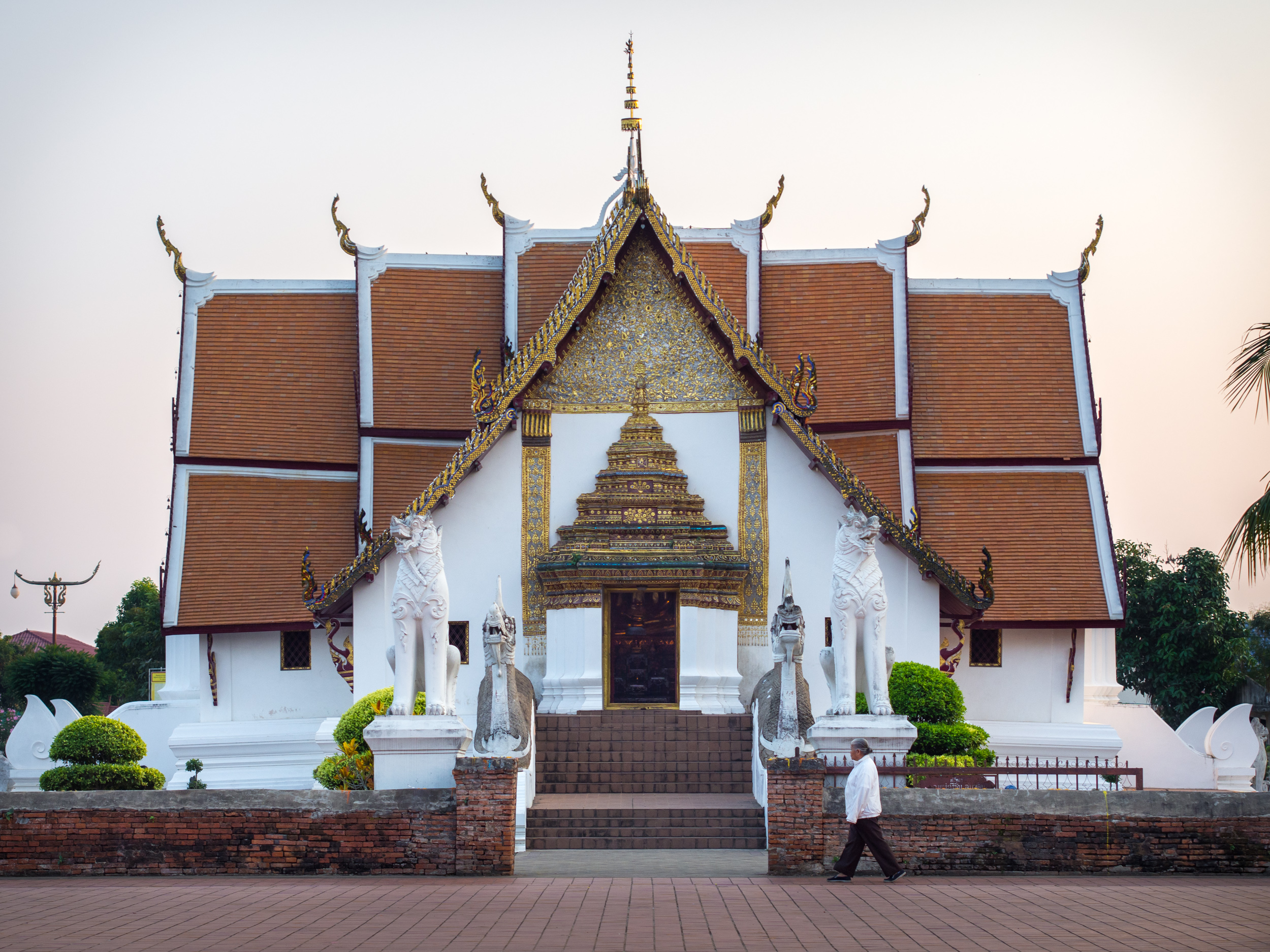
Wat Phumin

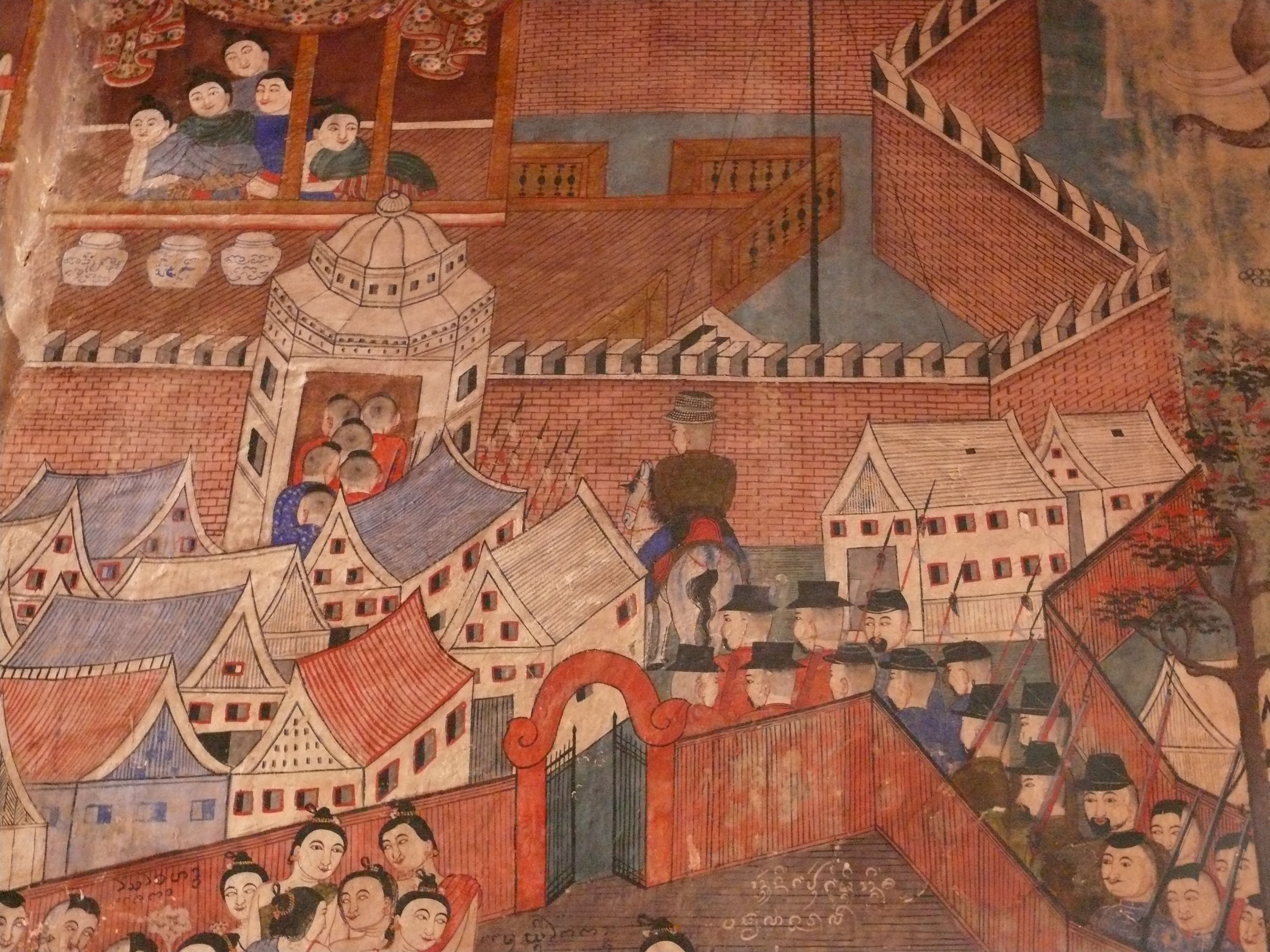
Murals of Wat Phumin

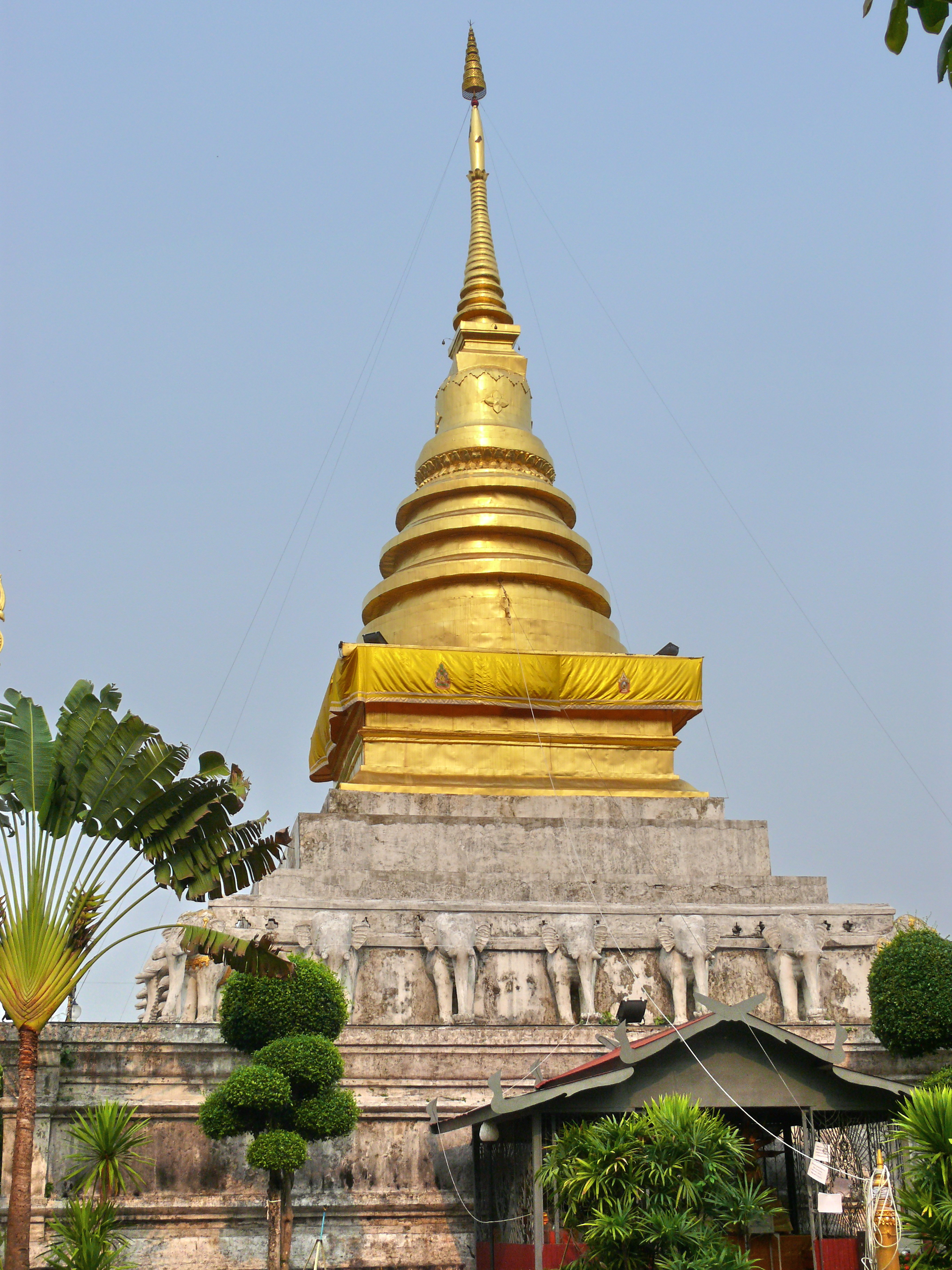
Wat Phra That Chang Kham

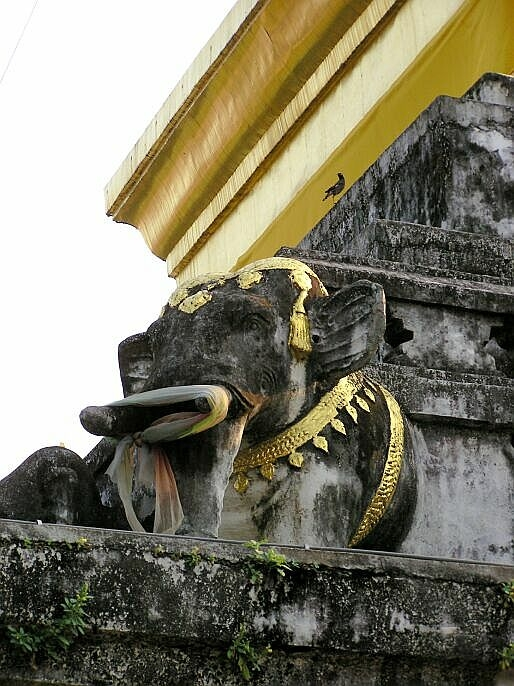
Gilded elephant heads of the chedi, Wat Phra That Chang Kham

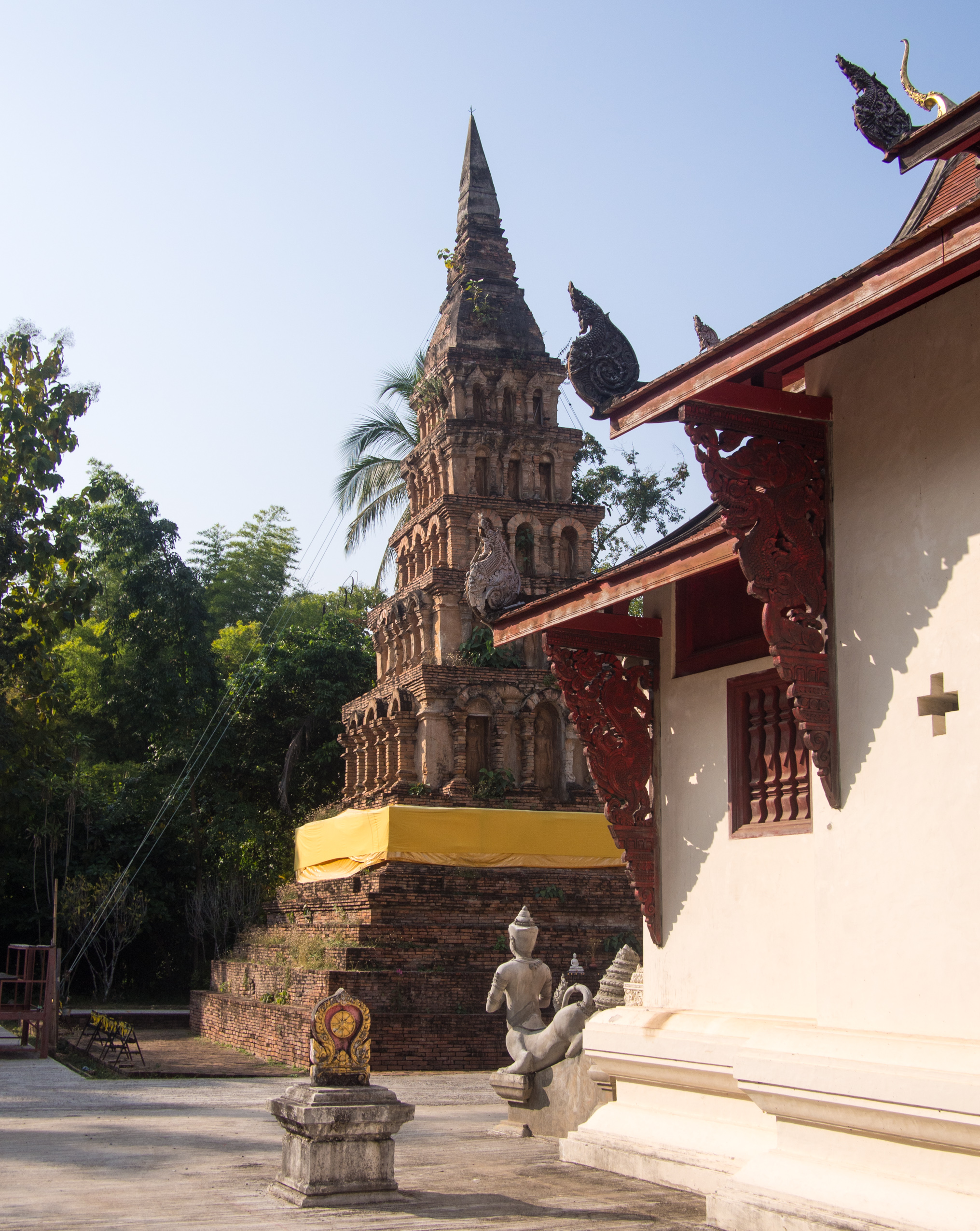
Hariphunchai-style chedi, Wat Phaya Wat
