= Walter McCormick =

American lawyer

Walter B. McCormick Jr.
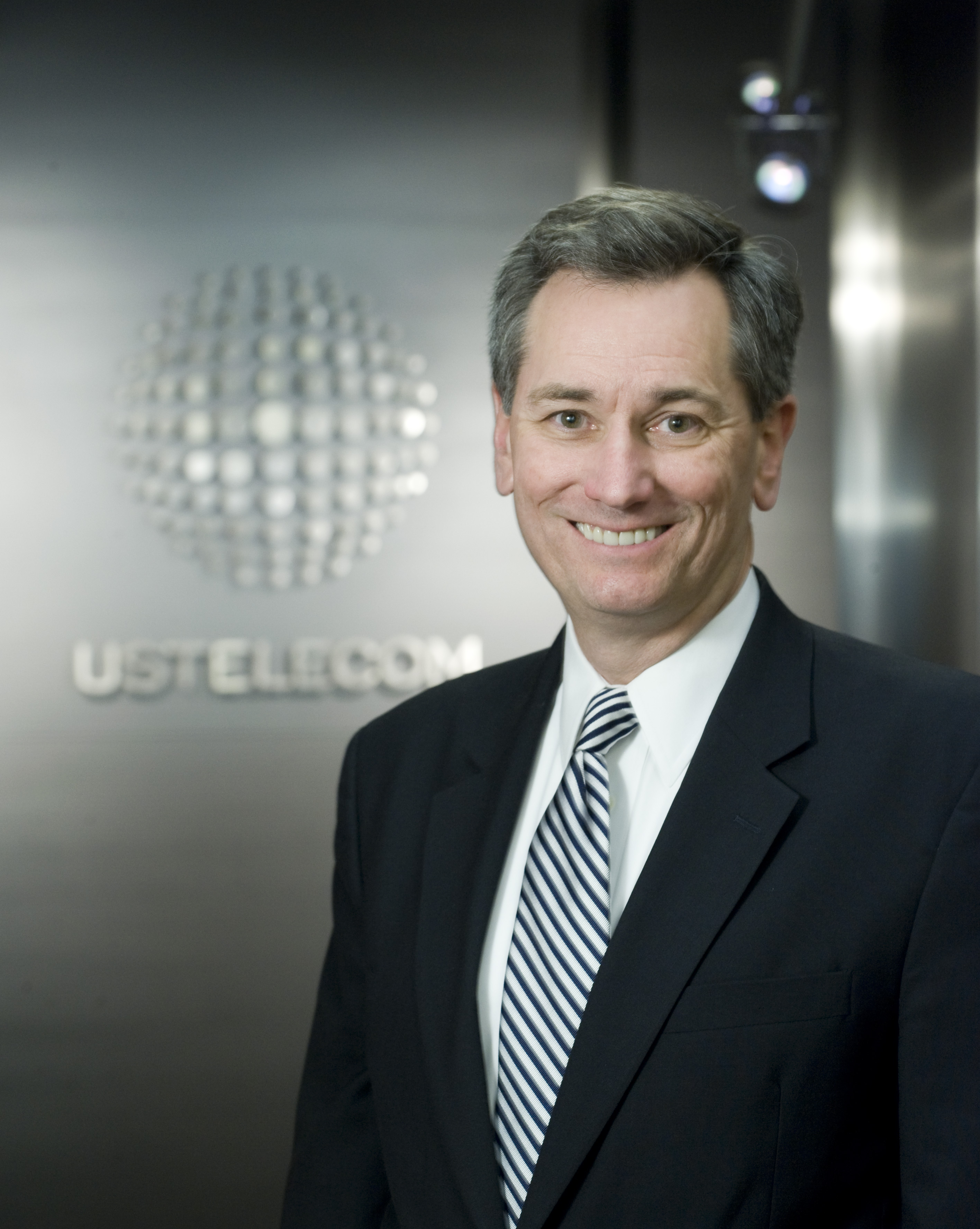
- Born: 8 February 1954 (age 72); Kansas City, Missouri
- Education: University of Missouri

Walter McCormick (born Walter Bernard McCormick, Jr.; February 8, 1954, Kansas City, Missouri), is a lawyer, former government official and former trade association executive.

McCormick was president and chief executive officer (CEO) of the United States Telecom Association from 2001 to 2016. He was previously president and CEO of the American Trucking Associations, Inc. He served in the United States government as general counsel of the U.S. Department of Transportation under President George H. W. Bush; and as general counsel of the U.S. Senate Committee on Commerce, Science & Transportation under the Chairmanship of Senator John C. Danforth (R-MO). He served under presidents George W. Bush and Barack H. Obama as a member of the National Security Telecommunications Advisory Committee.

== Early life and education ==
McCormick was born in Kansas City, Missouri, to Walter B. McCormick and Dorothy Power McCormick. He is a graduate of Rockhurst High School, Kansas City, Missouri (1972); the University of Missouri School of Journalism (B.J. 1976); and the University of Missouri School of Law (J.D. 1979). He studied international politics and economics at Georgetown University (1975), and completed the program for senior managers in government at Harvard University's John F. Kennedy School of Government (1987).

== Government service ==
McCormick was confirmed unanimously by the United States Senate on June 16, 1992, as the 15th general counsel of the U.S. Department of Transportation, where he served under Transportation Secretary Andrew Card as the chief legal officer of the department, Judge Advocate General of the U.S. Coast Guard, and third-ranking official after the secretary and deputy secretary. Prior to his confirmation, he served as general counsel of the U.S. Senate Committee on Commerce, Science & Transportation in the 99th Congress; as minority chief counsel and staff director of the committee in the 100th, 101st, and 102nd Congresses; and as legislative assistant to U.S. Senator John C. Danforth (R-MO) in the 97th and 98th Congresses. From 2005 to 2010, he served as a member of the President's National Security Telecommunications Advisory Committee, and as a member of the U.S. Department of State's Advisory Committee on International Communications and Information Policy.

== Private sector ==
McCormick was president and CEO of the United States Telecom Association from June 2001 through December 2016. He is a former president and CEO of the American Trucking Associations, Inc., and a former partner with the law firm Bryan Cave LLP – where he headed the practice group on regulatory affairs, public policy and legislation. He is a former member of the board of trustees of Rockhurst University. He is a member of the District of Columbia Bar, the Missouri Bar, and the Federal Communications Bar Association.

== Personal life ==
McCormick and his wife, Mary Lou, live in Alexandria, Virginia, where he serves on the board of directors of Good Shepherd Housing, a multi-denominational charitable organization that seeks to reduce homelessness.

== Published writings ==
- Search of the Newsroom: The Battle for a Reporter's Privilege Moves to New Ground, 44 Missouri Law Review 297 (1979)
- Press Access to Jails and Prisons, University of Missouri Freedom of Information Center Report No. 405 (June 1979)
- Op-ed: `Hours of service' rule for truckers may bring economy to jarring halt, Knight Ridder/Tribune, 24 May 2000
- Op-ed: We'll give users choices, USA Today, 15 February 2006
- Op-ed: Telecom industry is fighting fraud, USA Today, 8 August 2011

Preceded by Arthur J. Rothkopf	General Counsel, U.S. Department of Transportation; 1992-1993	Succeeded by Stephen H. Kaplan
