= Tony Severino =

American football coach

Tony Severino is American former high school football coach. He served as the head football coach at Rockhurst High School in Kansas City, Missouri from 1983 to 2019. He has won the most games as a head coach in Rockhurst High School football history. Severino's seven state titles are a state record which include five undefeated seasons. Severino is the only coach to win state titles in both Missouri and Kansas.

In 2019, the field at Rockhurst High School’s Vincent P. Dasta Memorial Stadium was named Severino Field in his honor.

== Personal life ==
Severino was raised in Euclid, Ohio, where he attended Cathedral Latin, an all-boys Catholic high school.

== Playing career ==
Severino played college football at Kansas State University, where he met his wife, Marilyn. Marilyn's desire to stay in Kansas soon kept him anchored in the state.

== Coaching career ==
Before coaching at Rockhurst, Severino was a head coach at Shawnee Mission Northwest High School where he won a state title.

After hearing about the job opening at Rockhurst High School, Severino waited an hour to inquire about the vacancy at school before he was told he got the job. Severino's first season with Rockhurst was in 1983 and the Hawklets won the state title that season. Severino was offered a coaching position on the Kansas Jayhawks coaching staff in 1985 but turned down the offer.

During the course of his coaching career, Severino led Rockhurst to the state championship ten times, winning seven of those. He won state titles in 1983, 1986, 1987, 2000, 2002, 2007, and 2010. In 2011, Severino coached the West Squad in the U.S Army All-American Bowl. In 2018, Severino was elected to the Missouri Sports Hall of Fame.
