= Cobb's Battery =

1st Kentucky Artillery
- Breckinridge Corps Flag
- Active: 1861–1865
- Country: Confederate States of America
- Allegiance: Kentucky
- Branch: Confederate States Army
- Role: Artillery
- Size: Battery
- Nickname: Cobb's Battery
- Engagements: American Civil War
- Decorations: 1865

Commanders
- Notable commanders: Hylan B. Lyon (first); Robert L. Cobb (second); Frank P. Gracey (third)

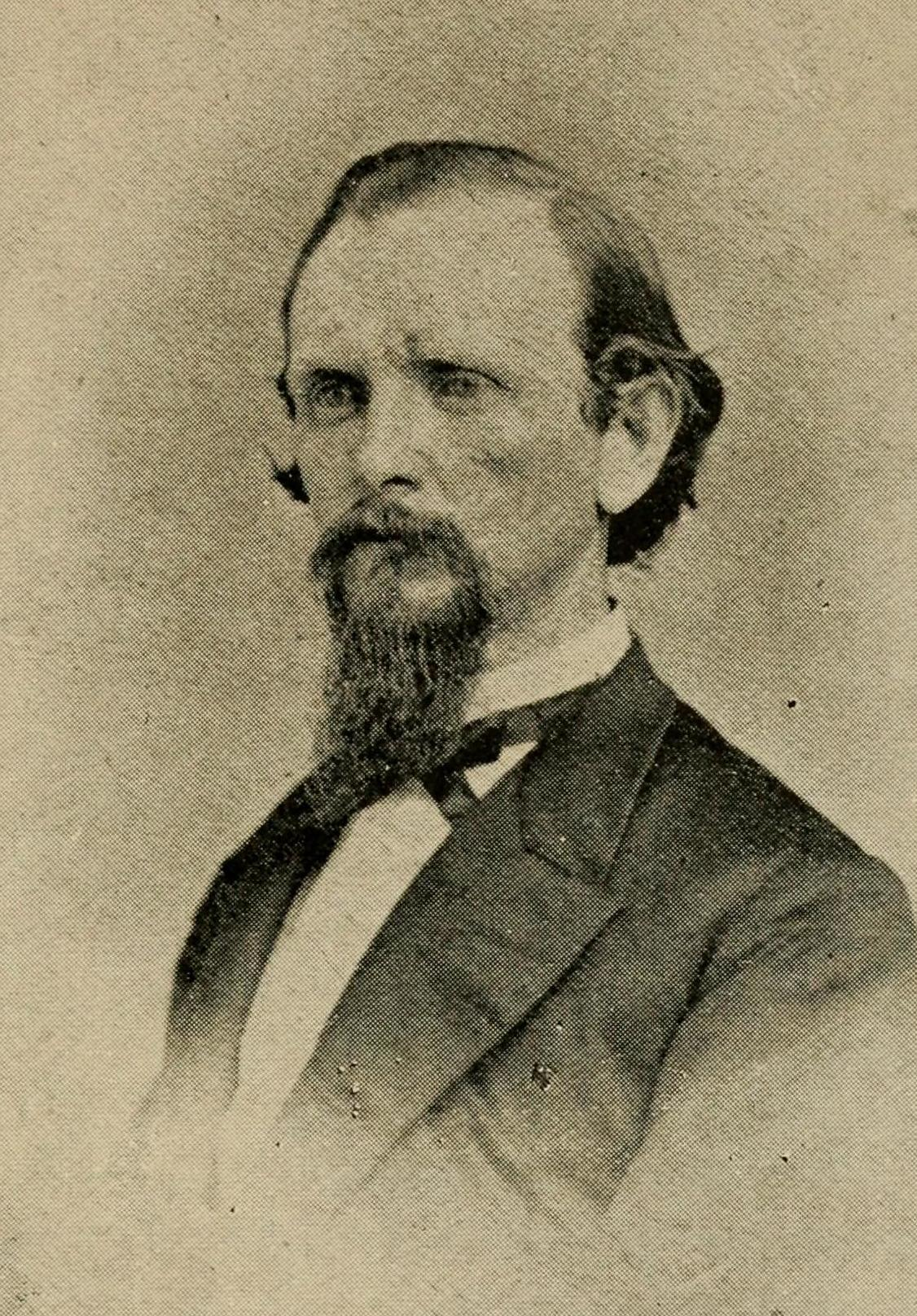
Major Robert Cobb

The 1st Kentucky Artillery (also known as Cobb's Battery) was an artillery battery that was a member of the Orphan Brigade in the Confederate States Army during the American Civil War. It fought in several engagements throughout the Western Theater, including the battles of Shiloh, Baton Rouge, Siege of Jackson, Sulphur Trestle, Resaca, Murfreesboro, Jonesborough, Chickamauga, Missionary Ridge, and Johnsonville. Following the end of the Atlanta campaign, Cobb's Battery was detached from the Orphan Brigade and reassigned to defend Mobile, Alabama.

== Formation ==
The battery was organized at the very outbreak of the American Civil War in 1861 at Mint Springs, Kuttawa, Kentucky. Former United States Army Officer, Hylan B. Lyon—who had resigned his commission when war became inevitable—was elected the first Captain of the battery. However, due to Kentucky's official policy of neutrality during the early days of the conflict, Captain Lyon found that he could not train and drill his battery properly in Mint Springs. Consequently, the battery moved to Clarksville, Tennessee and enlisted as a group to join the Confederate States Army. At Camp Boone the battery was trained in artillery, and from this point forward was known either as the 1st Kentucky Artillery or Cobb's Kentucky Battery.

Following Lyon's promotion to General, Robert H. Cobb was made Captain of the battery; under his command the unit moved to Bowling Green, Kentucky, and was officially brought into John C. Breckinridge's 1st Kentucky Brigade, later to gain fame as the "Orphan" Brigade.

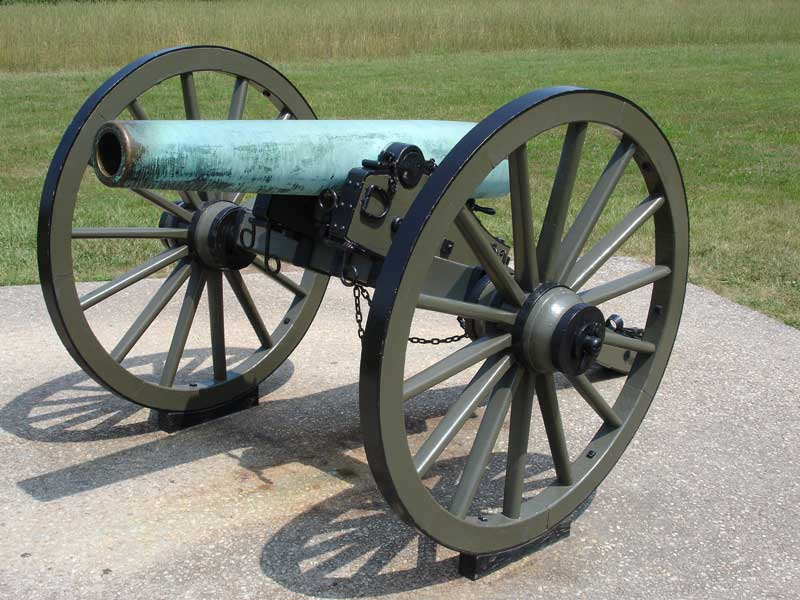
Confederate 12-Pounder "Napoleon"

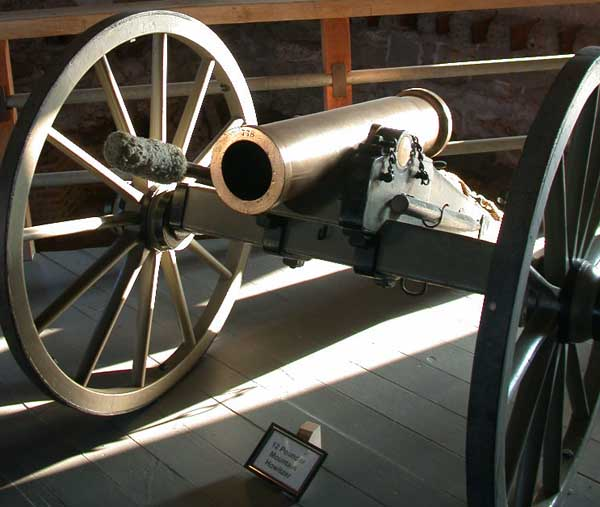
12-pounder howitzer similar to the ones used by the battery

== Armament ==
The battery started its service with four M1841 6-pounder smoothbore guns and two 12-pounder M1841 mountain howitzers. By July 1863 it had acquired four M1857 12-pounder Napoleon Guns, and, by the Atlanta Campaign, it had acquired a total of six 12-pounder Napoleon Guns. Three of the Napoleon Guns were named by the battery after Orphan Brigade commanders' wives, "Lady Breckinridge," "Lady Buckner," and "Lady Helm."

== Battles ==
=== Shiloh ===
The battery, listed on the Confederate Order of Battle as Lyon's Battery, took part in the Battle of Shiloh on 6 April 1862. Designated a reserve unit along with the remainder of Gen. Breckinridge's Division, the six-gun battery engaged the Federal Army at about 11:30 a.m., and its position was overrun by about noon, with all guns captured. The guns were subsequently recaptured by Confederate forces, but four removed from the field were not used again during the battle. The Shiloh National Military Park Marker also states that all horses were killed when the Federals overran the position, but another report indicates that horse belonging to Frank Gracey escaped death. That same report states that 34 members of the battery were killed in action during the combat. The battery could very well have been misnamed by Brig. Gen. Daniel Ruggles in his official report, calling the battery, "Captain Trabue's Kentucky," (which according to another Shiloh Military Park Marker, is a unit that is not mentioned another time in the Official Records, and Shiloh Military Park's Marker Finder attributes the location to "Cobb's Company.") which was used later in the day to reinforce the Confederate line, and also allowed Ruggles' Division to push further into the Federal line.

=== Baton Rouge ===
During the Battle of Baton Rouge, 5 August 1862, Cobb's Battery was a participant only at the beginning of the battle. The battery was ordered to the rear while the battle was still being fought, and was able to escape the Battle of Baton Rouge without a single casualty due to enemy fire. However, while in the swampland between Vicksburg, Mississippi and Baton Rouge, Louisiana, the entire Orphan Brigade was hit hard by malaria, to the point that by 11 August 1862, Cobb's Battery had dropped from 117 men fit for duty to only 36.

=== Chickamauga ===
Cobb's Battery, along with Slocomb's Battery and the residue of the Orphan Brigade under the brigade command of Brig. Gen. Benjamin H. Helm, and making up a portion of Breckinridge's Division, was deployed across Glass' Ford with two cannons on 19 September 1863. During the ensuing artillery duel, the commands of Cobb, Slocomb, and Helm suffered 22 wounded or dead, which equaled the Union losses during the battle. On the following day, a portion of the battery was sent to Brig. Gen. Nathan Bedford Forrest to assist in repelling the Union advance.

=== Missionary Ridge ===
The battery, still in Breckinridge's Division, was set on the left flank of Bragg's Army of Tennessee, and was credited by Bragg with causing "much confusion before the enemy reached musket range." However, following the collapse of the Confederate defensive line on the ridge, guns "Lady Buckner" and "Lady Breckinridge" were captured by forces under Maj. Gen. Philip H. Sheridan.

== Reenactment ==
There is a Cobb's Battery unit, serving in the Washington Civil War Association. And another in Alabama Division of Reenactors http://www.alabamadivision.com

== See also ==
- List of Kentucky Civil War Confederate units
