= Orphan Brigade =

First Kentucky Brigade
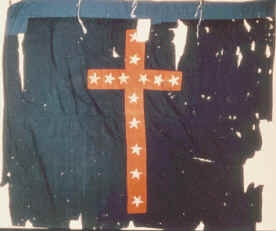
- Regimental flag of the 4th Kentucky Infantry Regiment, the flag is similar to the Orphan Brigade's brigade flag
- Active: 1861–1865
- Country: Confederate States
- Allegiance: Kentucky
- Branch: Confederate States Army
- Size: Brigade
- Nickname: "Orphan Brigade"
- Arms: Enfield rifled muskets
- Engagements: American Civil War: Battle of Shiloh; First Battle of Corinth; Siege of Vicksburg; Battle of Baton Rouge; Siege of Port Hudson; Battle of Stones River; Siege of Jackson; Battle of Chickamauga; Atlanta campaign; Battle of Stockbridge; Battle of Oconee River Bridge; Carolinas campaign

Commanders
- Commanding officers: Brig. Gen. John C. Breckinridge; Brig. Gen. Roger W. Hanson †; Brig. Gen. Benjamin H. Helm †; Brig. Gen. Joseph H. Lewis

The Orphan Brigade was the nickname of the First Kentucky Brigade, a group of military units recruited from Kentucky to fight for the Confederate States of America during the American Civil War. The brigade was the largest Confederate unit to be recruited from Kentucky during the war. Its original commander was John C. Breckinridge, former United States vice president, and Kentucky's former senator, who was enormously popular with Kentuckians.

== History ==
The regiments that were part of the Orphan Brigade were the 2nd, 3rd, 4th, 5th, 6th, and 9th Kentucky Infantry Regiments. Units of the Orphan Brigade were involved in many military engagements in the American South during the war, including the Battle of Shiloh. In 1862, Breckinridge was promoted to division command and was succeeded in the brigade by Brigadier General Roger W. Hanson. At the Battle of Stones River, the brigade suffered heavy casualties in an assault on January 2, 1863, including General Hanson. Breckinridge—who vehemently disputed the order to charge with the army's commander, General Braxton Bragg—rode among the survivors, crying out repeatedly, "My poor Orphans! My poor Orphans," noted brigade historian Ed Porter Thompson, who used the term in his 1868 history of the unit. The name came from how the Confederacy viewed its soldiers from Kentucky (which remained neutral in the Union, though half the state seceded and formed the Confederate government of Kentucky, was claimed by the Confederacy, and was represented by a star in both countries' flags and had representation in both governments). The term was not in widespread use during the war, but it became popular afterwards among the veterans.

The Orphan Brigade lost another commander at the Battle of Chickamauga, when Brigadier General Benjamin H. Helm, Abraham Lincoln's brother-in-law, was mortally wounded on September 20, 1863, and died the following day. Major Rice E. Graves, the artillery commander, was also mortally wounded.

The Orphan Brigade served throughout the Atlanta campaign of 1864, then were converted to mounted infantry and opposed Sherman's March to the Sea. They ended the war fighting in South Carolina in late April 1865, and surrendered at Washington, Georgia, on May 6–7, 1865.

Captain Fayette Hewitt, Helm's assistant Adjutant-General, had all the brigade's papers (over twenty volumes of record books, morning reports, letter-copy books as well as thousands of individual orders and reports) boxed up and taken to Washington. After the surrender, Hewitt brought the boxes back to Kentucky with him, and in 1887 he donated them to the U.S. War Department.

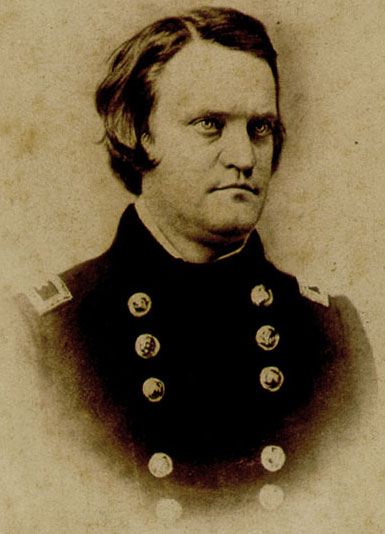
Brigadier General John C. Breckinridge, who commanded the Kentucky Brigade until 1862

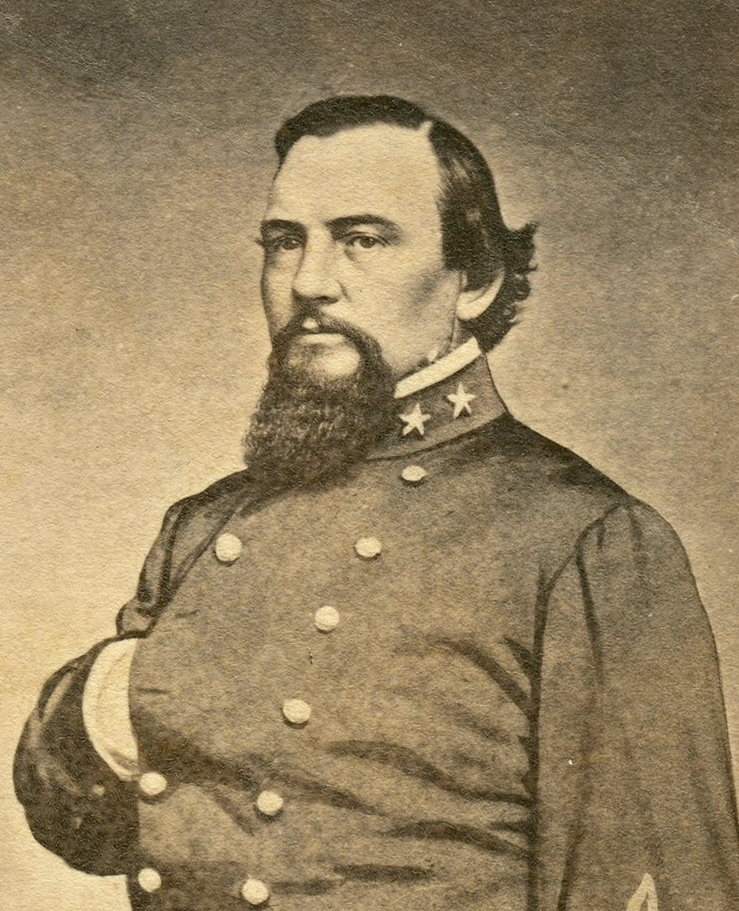
Brigadier General Roger W. Hanson, commander of the Kentucky Brigade from 1862 until his mortal wounding at the Battle of Stones River in 1863

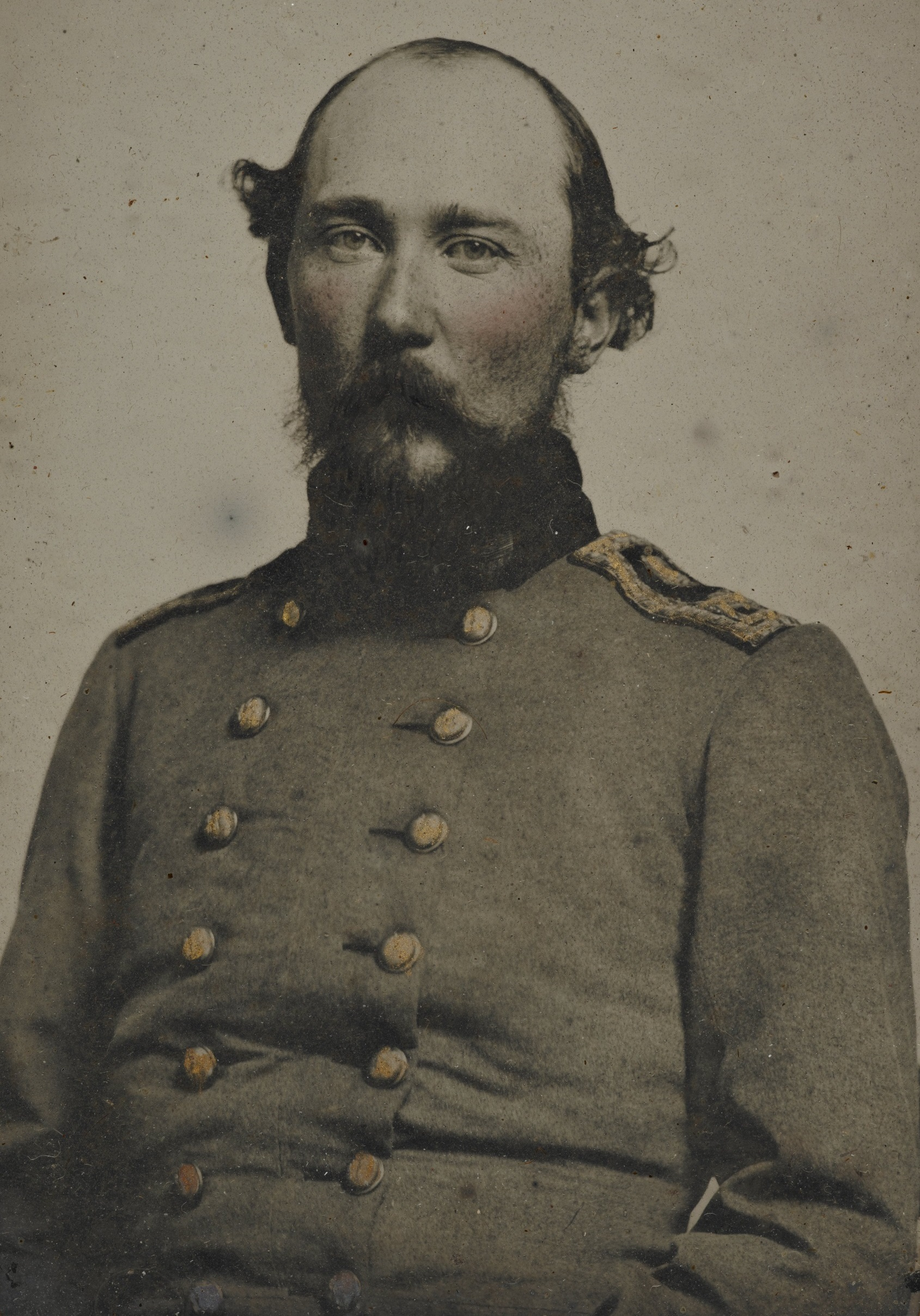
Brigadier General Benjamin H. Helm, who was mortally wounded while leading the Kentucky Brigade at Chickamauga

== Arms ==
When the Orphan Brigade was mustered into service, weapons were in short supply. The troops were armed with old smoothbore muskets (some flintlock and others percussion) along with shotguns and hunting rifles (Hawkens). They were given a bounty if they brought their own rifle. Some men had no arms at all. Only a week before the Battle of Shiloh, every regiment except the 9th Kentucky was issued a supply of Enfield rifles imported from England (the 9th armed themselves with Enfields captured during the battle).

From that point onward, most of the Orphan Brigade carried the long three-band Model 1853 Enfield rifle. When the unit surrendered in March 1865, some men were still carrying the same rifles they had had since Shiloh.

== Organization ==
=== The original units of the Orphan Brigade ===
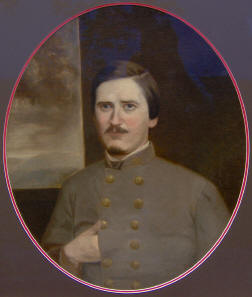
Maj. Rice E. Graves, 1862, commanded Graves' Battery

- 2nd Kentucky Infantry, organized at Camp Boone, July 17, 1861
- 3rd Kentucky Infantry, organized at Camp Boone, July 20, 1861
- 4th Kentucky Infantry, organized at Camp Burnett, September 13, 1861
- 6th Kentucky Infantry, organized at Bowling Green, November 19, 1861
- 9th Kentucky Infantry, organized at Bowling Green, Kentucky October 3, 1861, as the 5th Kentucky Infantry (Preliminary organization; final organization not complete until May 15, 1862.)
- Cobb's Battery, organized at Mint Springs, Kuttawa, Kentucky, 1861 (After a period of training at Camp Boone the troops moved to Bowling Green, Ky. in September 1861 and The First Kentucky Battery was formally brigaded under Gen. John C. Breckinridge)
- Graves' Battery, commanded by Major Rice E. Graves Jr., organized at Bowling Green, November 8, 1861
- Byrne's Artillery Battery, organized in Washington County, Mississippi, July 1861. (Disbanded during summer 1862, at Vicksburg, Mississippi, with men and guns being transferred to Cobb's Battery.)
- Morgan's Men, organized at Bowling Green, November 5, 1861

=== Other units that joined the Orphan Brigade ===
- 5th Kentucky Infantry
- 41st Alabama Infantry (fought as part of the Orphan Brigade at Murfreesboro, the Siege of Jackson and Chickamauga)
- 31st/49th Alabama Infantry

=== Formally in but not directly serving with ===
- 1st Kentucky Cavalry, organized at Bowling Green 1861

== Notable members ==
- John C. Breckinridge
- Marcellus Jerome Clarke (a.k.a. Sue Mundy)
- Benjamin H. Helm
- John Hunt Morgan
- Rice E. Graves Jr.
- Thomas Boston Gordon
- Roger Weightman Hanson (a.k.a. "Old Flintlock”)

== See also ==
- List of Kentucky Civil War Confederate units
- Kentucky in the Civil War
