= 5th Kentucky Infantry Regiment =

5th Kentucky Infantry Regiment may refer to:

- 5th Kentucky Infantry Regiment (Confederate), a regiment in the Confederate States Army
- 5th Kentucky Infantry Regiment (Union), a regiment in the Union Army
- 9th Kentucky Infantry Regiment (Confederate), originally called the 5th Regiment

== See also ==
- 5th Kentucky Cavalry Regiment, a regiment in the Union Army
