= Battle of Baton Rouge (1862) =

Battle of the American Civil War

- Part of the Trans-Mississippi Theater of the American Civil War
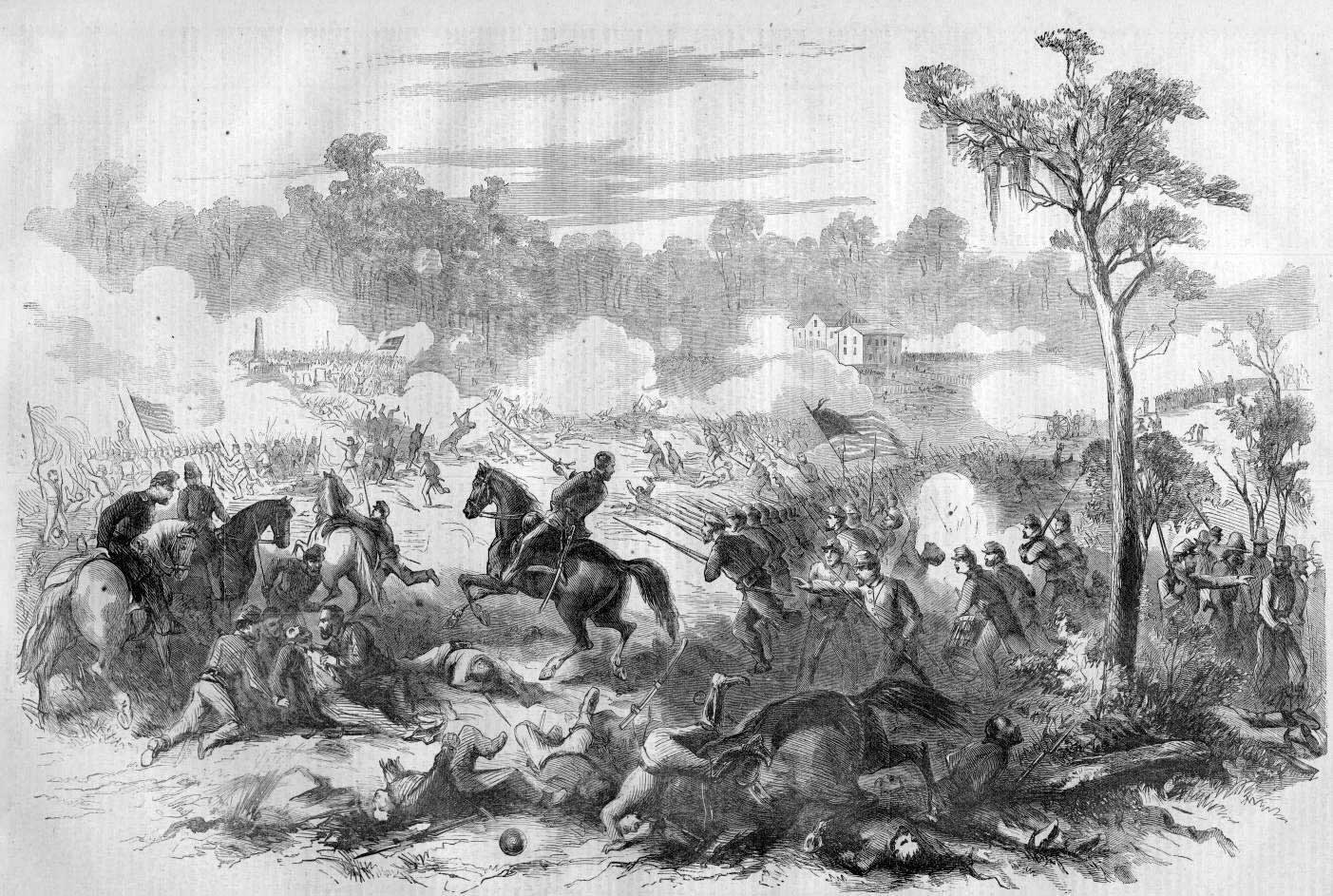
- Harper's Weekly, September 6, 1862 edition
Date	August 5, 1862
Location	Baton Rouge, Louisiana 30.4510°N 91.1676°W
Result	Union victory

Belligerents
United States	Confederate States

Commanders and leaders
Thomas R. Williams †; Thomas W. Cahill; David D. Porter	John C. Breckinridge; Charles Clark (POW); Daniel Ruggles; Charles W. Read

Strength
2,500	2,600

Casualties and losses
383 (84 killed, 266 wounded, 33 missing)	453 (95 killed, 302 wounded, 56 missing)
- Location of Baton Rouge in Louisiana

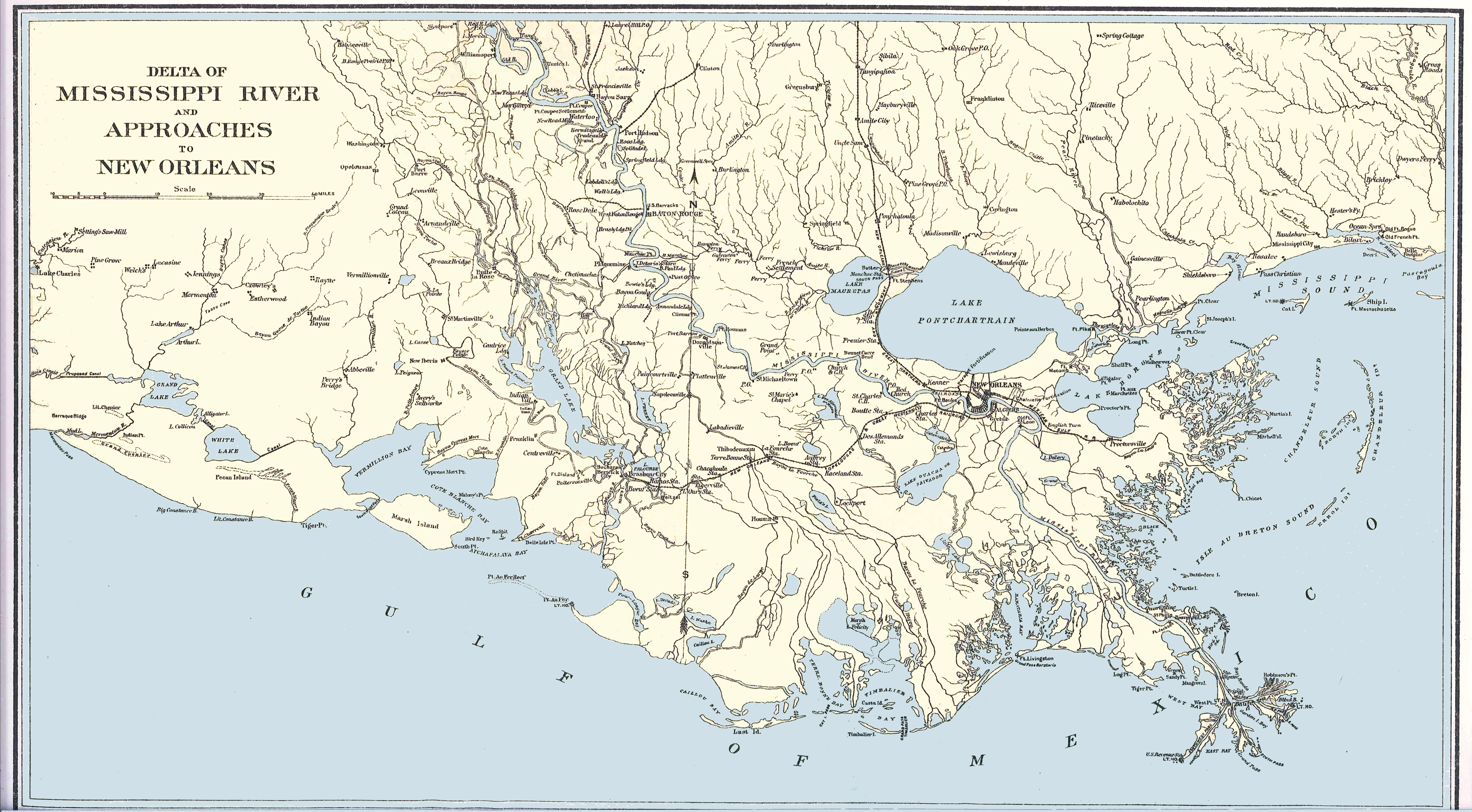
Map depicting Louisiana and approaches to New Orleans as depicted during the Civil War.

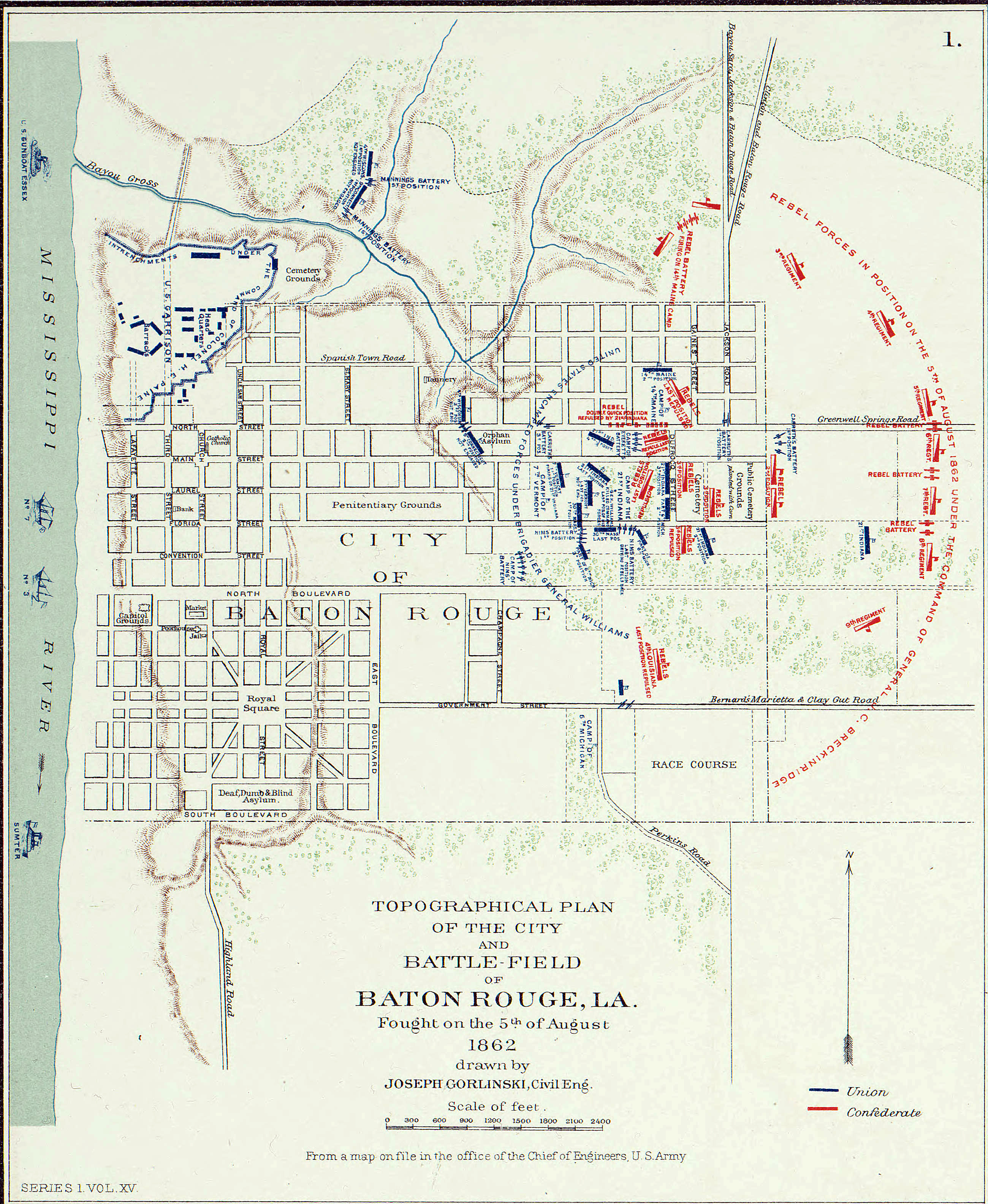
Map depicting Battle of Baton Rouge, August 5th 1862.

The Battle of Baton Rouge was a ground and naval battle in the American Civil War fought in East Baton Rouge Parish, Louisiana, on August 5, 1862. The Union victory halted Confederate attempts to recapture the capital city of Louisiana.

== Background ==
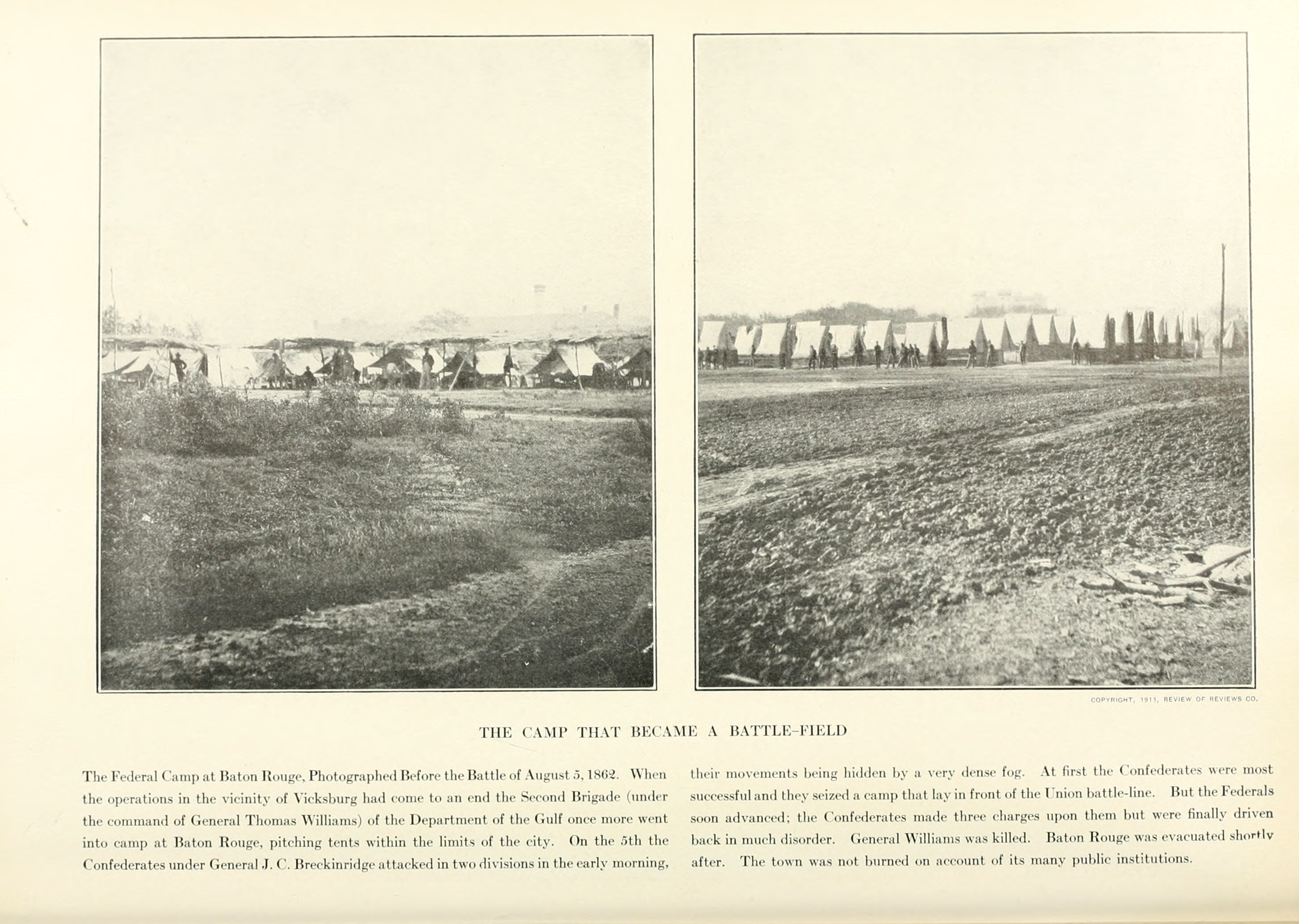
Federal Camp at Baton Rouge prior to the battle.

On April 25, 1862, the day before New Orleans fell to the US Navy fleet under Admiral David Farragut, the Confederate state government decided to abandon Baton Rouge, moving first to Opelousas, and then to Shreveport. All cotton in the area was set afire to prevent it falling into Union hands. On May 9, Navy Commander James S. Palmer of the federal gunboat USS Iroquois landed at the town wharf and took possession, without resistance, of the Pentagon Barracks and the arsenal. Two weeks later, a party of guerrillas attacked a rowboat carrying a naval officer. In retaliation, Farragut's flagship, the Hartford, bombarded the town, causing civilian casualties and damaging St. Joseph's Church and other buildings. On May 29, US Brigadier General Thomas Williams arrived with six regiments of infantry, two artillery batteries, and a troop of cavalry, and began the occupation of Baton Rouge.

During the summer, Major General Earl Van Dorn, commander of Confederate forces east of the Mississippi, resisted a Union bombardment of Vicksburg. The Confederate ironclad ram Arkansas had come down the Yazoo River, inflicting damage on the unprepared Union fleet as she passed through, and was anchored in Vicksburg. Van Dorn desired to regain Baton Rouge. It was thought that re-taking Baton Rouge would be key to driving the Union out of Louisiana, as they could then launch attacks along the Red River on Union-occupied territory, and threaten Union control of New Orleans.

Five thousand men entrained from Vicksburg for Camp Moore, led by Maj. Gen. John C. Breckinridge, on July 27. They were joined by a small infantry division led by Brig. Gen. Daniel Ruggles at the camp. Simultaneously, the Arkansas was sailing down the Mississippi River, en route to engage Union ships near Baton Rouge. The men had a significant amount of matériel, and were well fed. General Williams reportedly had word of the forces' departure from Camp Moore on July 28. On August 4, after information was again received of the imminent arrival of the enemy, Union troops were formed up a mile outside of Baton Rouge. The Union men at Baton Rouge were not experienced, and were in training camp for only two weeks before being sent to Baton Rouge. The troops had few supplies because most were in New Orleans, which was considered more important.

== Battle ==
Breckinridge moved to the Comite River, 10 miles (16 km) east of Baton Rouge, by August 4, and then marched the men closer at night. The Confederates lost the element of surprise when they were discovered by Union sentries. Despite this, the attack was launched at daybreak on August 5.

The Union troops were in the center of Baton Rouge, while the Confederates were lined up in two divisions, north of the city. The action occurred around Florida Street, and began with the Confederates pushing their opponents all the way across town. Bitter fighting took place, especially around Magnolia Cemetery. The Union commander, Brigadier General Thomas Williams, was killed in action. Colonel Thomas W. Cahill took over.

The colonel led a retreat back to prepared defensive lines near the Penitentiary, under the protection of the Union warships. The Confederate troops began coming under fire from the gunboats. The undermanned Confederate ironclad Arkansas arrived not long after to engage the Union ironclad USS Essex, but her engines failed just four miles above the city. Her commander ordered Arkansas set afire to prevent her capture.

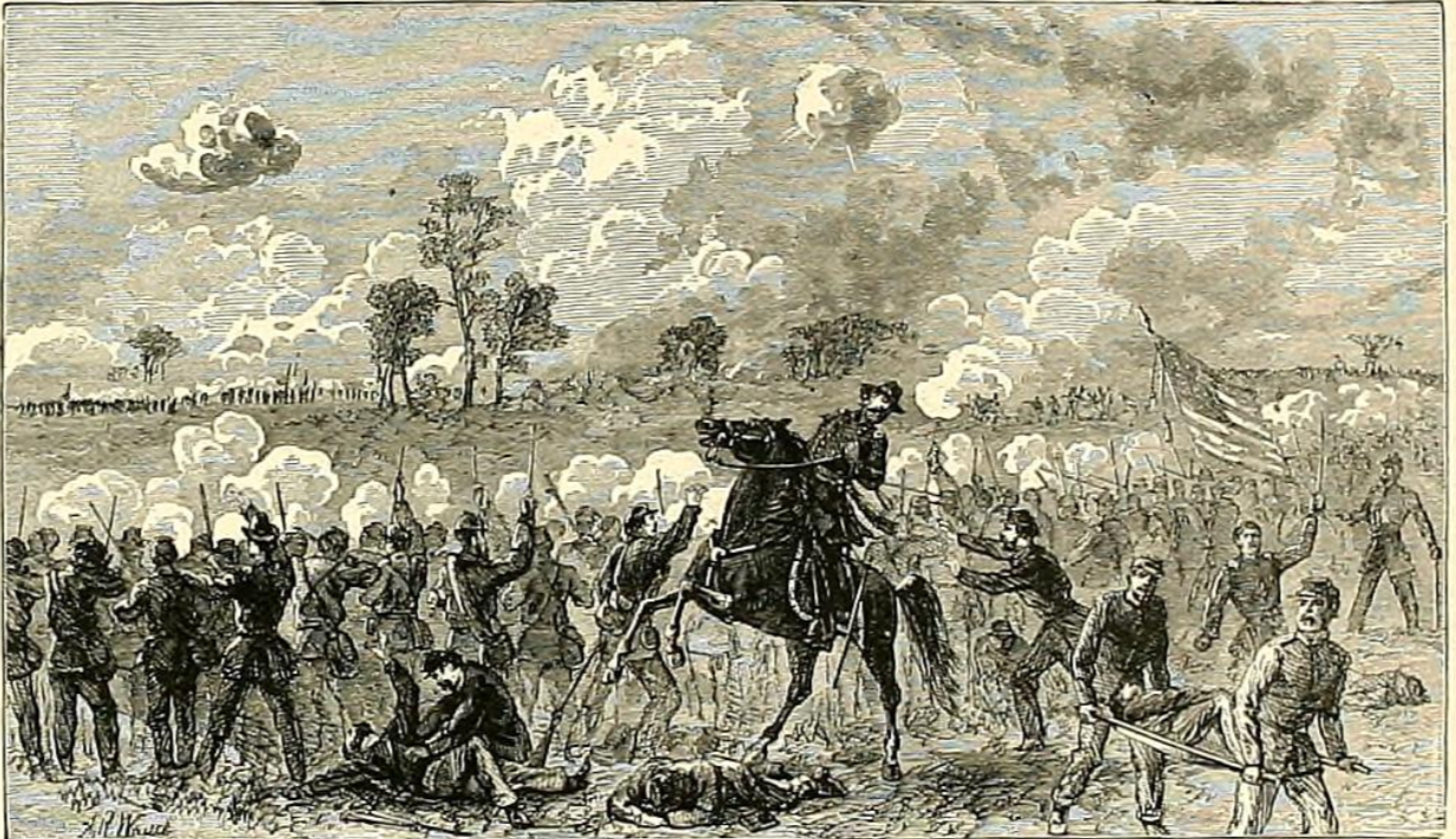
Death of General Thomas Williams during the battle

Without any prospect of naval support, Breckenridge was unable to attack the Union positions and withdrew. Union troops evacuated the city a week later, concerned for the safety of New Orleans, but returned that autumn. Confederates occupied Port Hudson, which they held for almost another year.

The "Battle of Baton Rouge Commemorative Ceremony" is held every year on the first Saturday in August in and around Magnolia Cemetery, sponsored by the Foundation for Historical Louisiana.

== Order of battle ==
=== Union Army ===
2nd Brigade, Department of the Gulf

Brig. Gen. Thomas Williams (k)

Col. Thomas W. Cahill

Infantry Regiments

- 9th Connecticut Infantry
- 21st Indiana Infantry
- 14th Maine Infantry
- 30th Massachusetts Infantry
- 6th Michigan Infantry
- 7th Vermont Infantry
- 4th Wisconsin Infantry

Artillery

- Indiana Battery
- 2nd Battery, Massachusetts Light Artillery
- 4th Battery, Massachusetts Light Artillery
- 6th Battery, Massachusetts Light Artillery

=== Union Navy ===
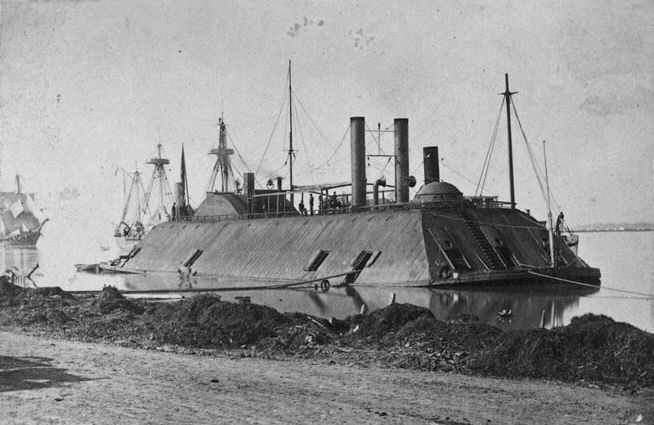
The USS Essex, which saw action in the battle

- USS Hartford
- USS Westfield
- USS Jackson
- USS Cayuga
- USS Katahdin
- USS Brooklyn
- USS Clifton
- USS Sciota
- USS Kineo
- USS Essex

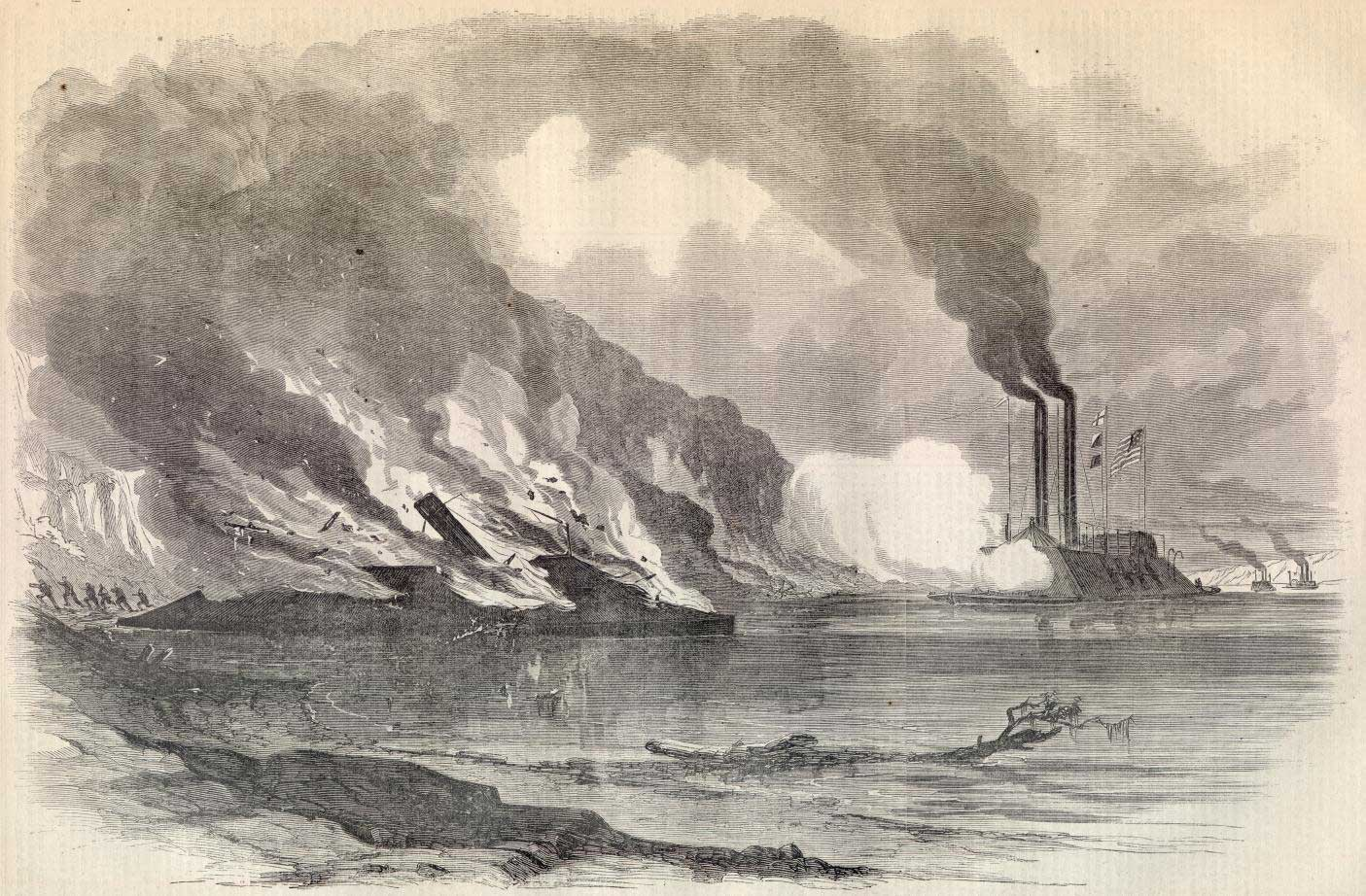
The Essex fires on the burning Arkansas

=== Confederate Army ===
Breckinridge's Corps: Maj. Gen. John C. Breckinridge

First Division: Brig. Gen. Charles Clark (w&c); Col. Walter S. Statham

1st Brigade: Brig. Gen. Benjamin H. Helm (w); Col. Robert P. Trabue

- 31st Mississippi
- 4th Kentucky: Col. Robert P. Trabue
- 9th Kentucky
- 49th Alabama
- 4th Alabama Battalion

2nd Brigade: Col Walter S. Statham; Col. Francis M. Walker

- 15th Mississippi
- 22nd Mississippi
- 19th Tennessee: Col. Francis M. Walker
- 20th Tennessee: Col. Thomas B. Smith
- 28th Tennessee
- 45th Tennessee

Second Division: Brig. Gen. Daniel Ruggles

1st Brigade: Col. Albert P. Thompson (w); Col. Joseph H. Lewis

- 35th Alabama
- 3rd Kentucky
- 6th Kentucky: Col. Joseph H. Lewis
- 7th Kentucky

2nd Brigade: Col. Henry W. Allen (w); Col. Gustavus A. Breaux

- 4th Louisiana
- (Not Engaged) 12th Louisiana: Col. Thomas M. Scott
- 30th Louisiana: Col. Gustavus A. Breaux
- 9th Louisiana Battalion

Unattached:

- 9th Louisiana Partisan Rangers Battalion

Artillery:

- Pettus' Mississippi Battery
- Semmes' Confederate Regular Battery
- Cobb's Kentucky Battery

(Bowen's Brigade) Not Engaged: Brig. Gen. John S. Bowen

- 1st Missouri
- 9th Arkansas
- 10th Arkansas
- 6th Mississippi
- 33rd Mississippi
- Caruthers' Mississippi Sharpshooters

=== Confederate Navy ===
CSS Arkansas; Lieut. Charles W. Read

== Gallery ==
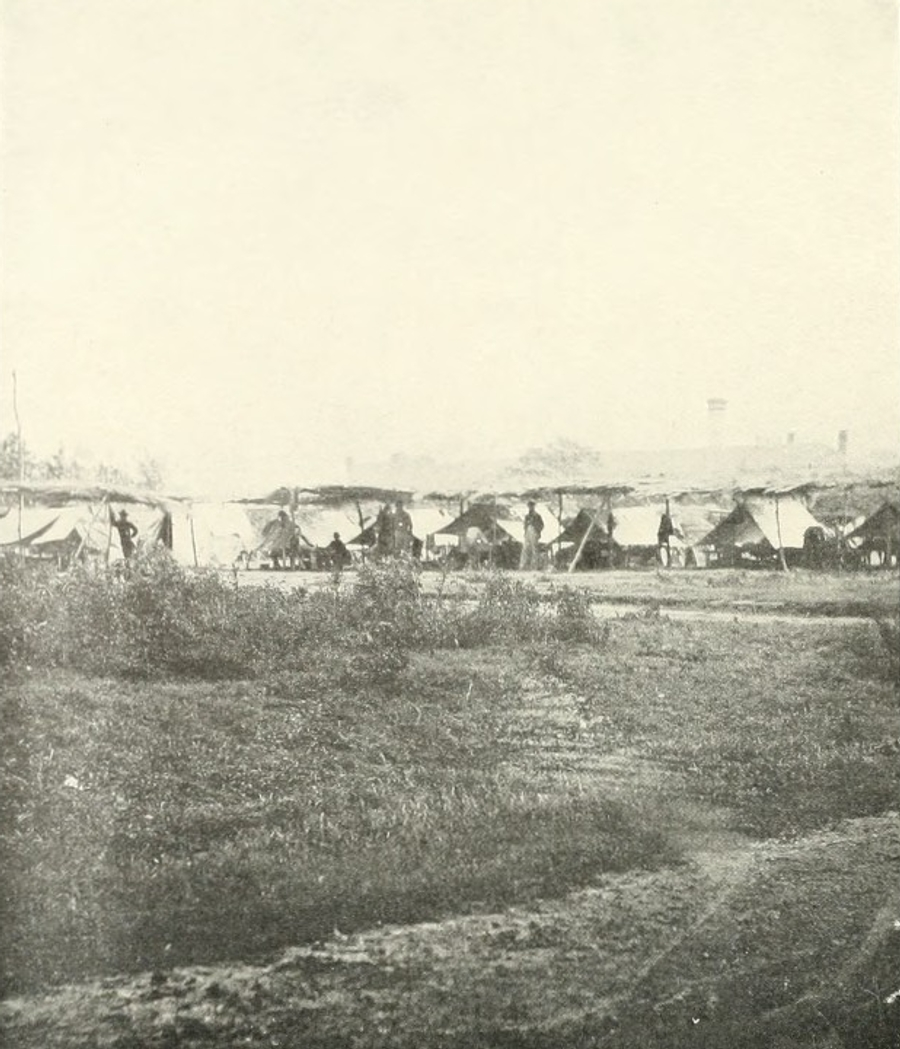
Union troops of the 2nd Brigade under the command of General Thomas Williams encamped in the city limits.

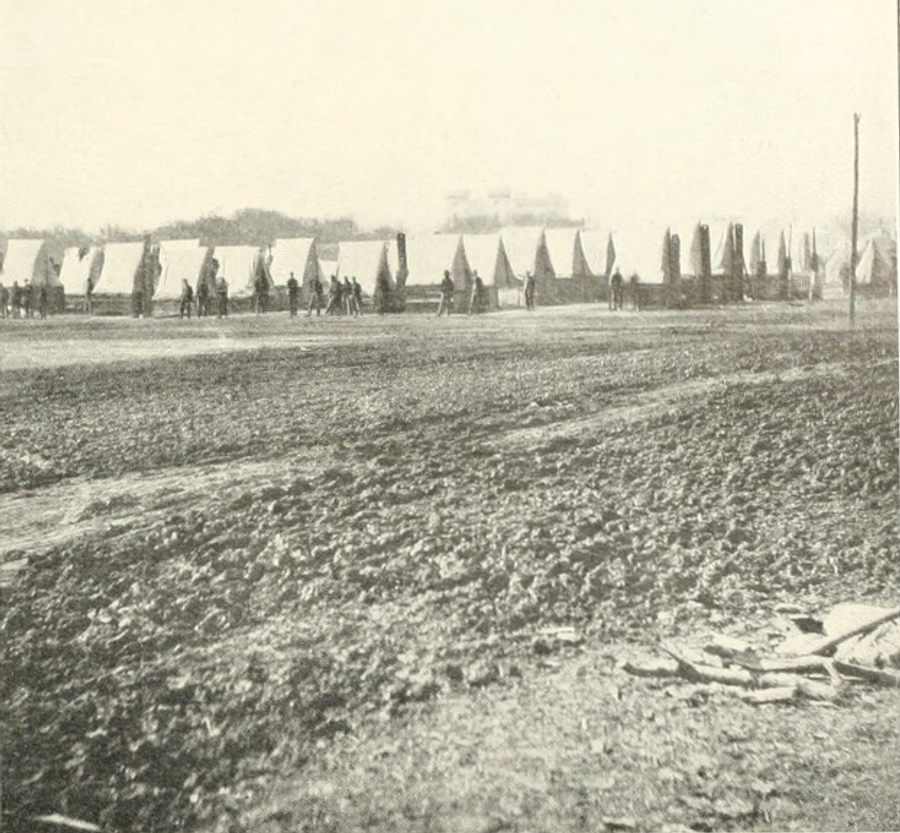
Union troops of the 2nd Brigade under the command of General Thomas Williams encamped in the city limits of Baton Rouge.

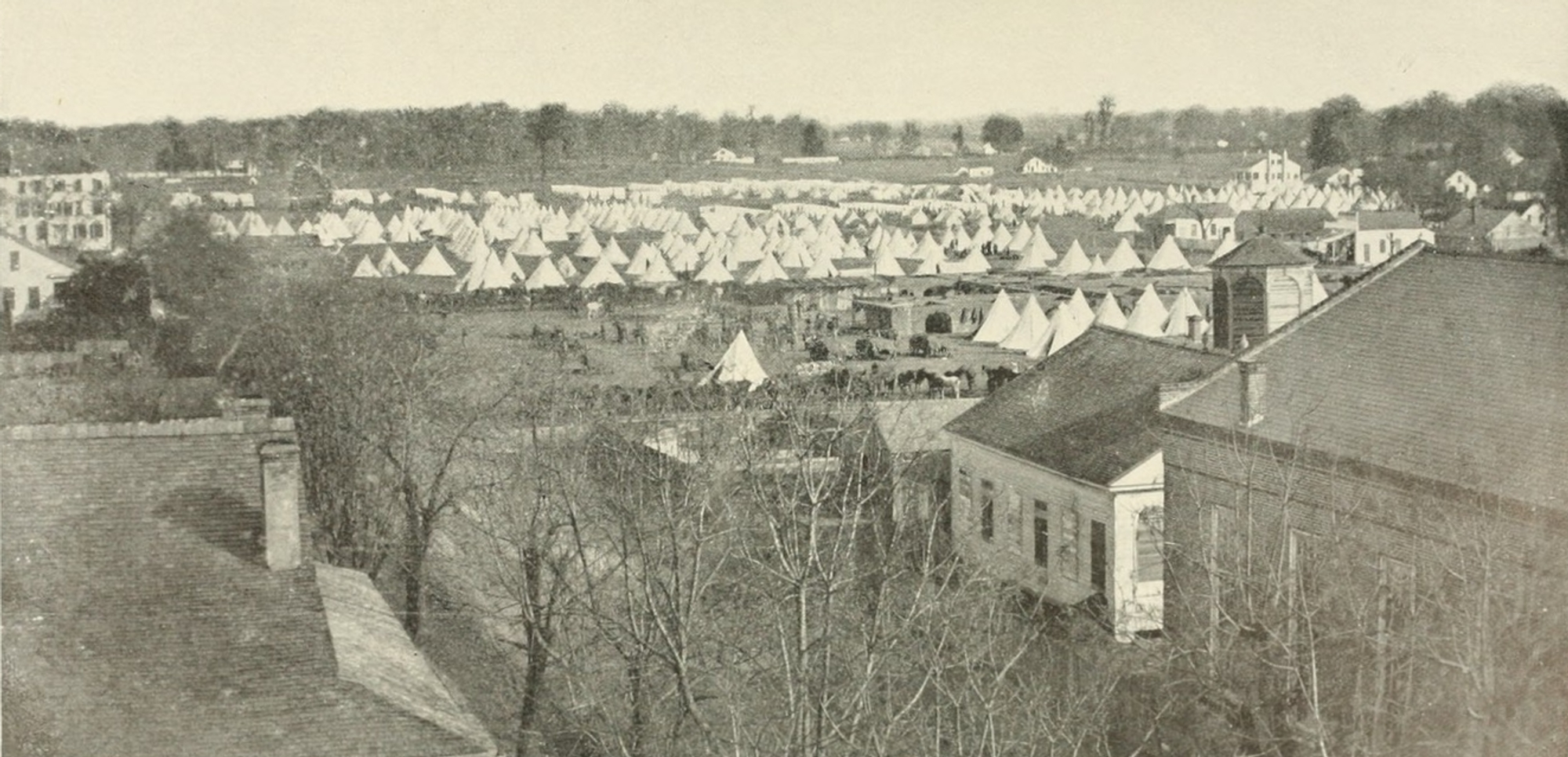
Union Camp Banks, temporary home to the 7th Vermont, 21st Indiana and Nims' Battery in Baton Rouge photographed in late July 1862.

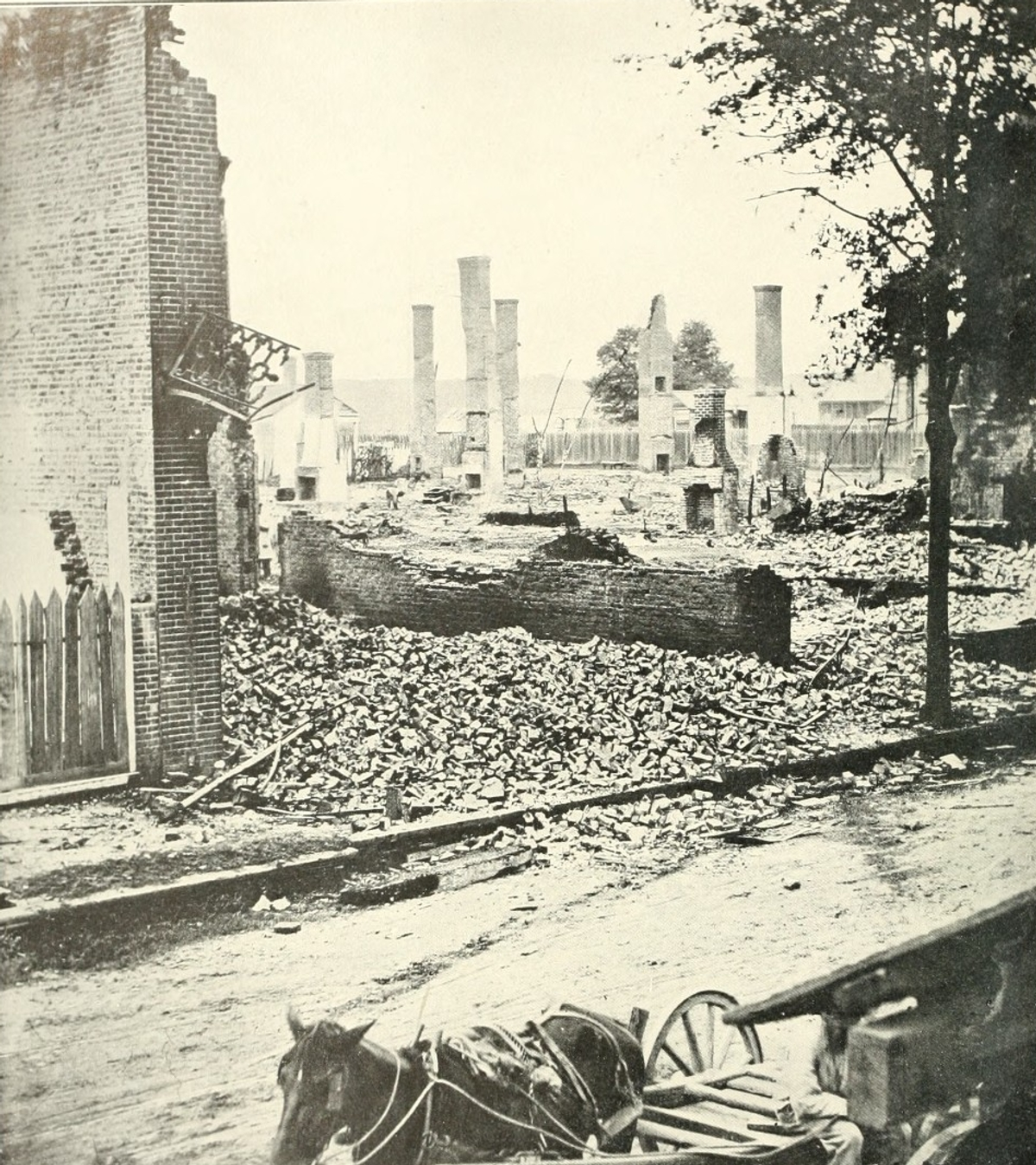
These homes near the southeastern flank of the arsenal at Baton Rouge were ordered destroyed by Union Colonel Halbert E. Paine after the surprise attack so that they would not afford shelter to any potential attackers.
