= Byrne's Kentucky Battery =

Byrne's Battery
- Active: 1861–1863
- Country: Confederate States of America
- Allegiance: Confederate States Army
- Branch: Orphan Brigade
- Type: Artillery
- Size: Battery

Commanders
- Notable commanders: Edward P. Byrne

Byrne's Battery was a light artillery battery in the Confederate Army during the American Civil War. It fought exclusively in the Western Theater and suffered among the highest casualties of Confederate batteries at the Battle of Stones River.

The unit was formed by Edward P. Byrne, a native Kentuckian living in Washington County, Mississippi. After South Carolina's secession, Byrne was determined to raise a battery of artillery for service in the Confederate Army. With help from donations from the citizens of Washington County and his own substantial wealth, he raised his company and obtained many horses. He also ordered six guns from a firm in Memphis, Tennessee. He began recruiting in Mississippi and later in his native Kentucky. He went to Louisville, Kentucky, to recruit volunteers, which he helped to secretly move to Camp Boone, where several other pro-Confederacy Kentucky regiments were forming, despite the state's official policy of neutrality.

== Armament ==
Bryne armed his men with the finest cannons available at the time. He initially acquired four six-pound smoothbore field guns and two twelve-pound howitzers from the Quniby and Robinson foundry firm in Memphis. He also captured several another field piece during the push into Bowling Green. He mounted his men on the finest horses (horses were in such abundance that he gave 30 of them to unmounted men of now famous Captain (later General) John Hunt Morgan's cavalry squadron) and gave them fine well-crafted carriages, caissons, limbers and other accoutrements he had special-ordered from another firm in Memphis.

== Service ==
Byrne first offered his services to P.G.T. Beauregard in South Carolina, but upon learning that Fort Sumter had already fallen, he decided to attach his battery to the organization now forming at Camp Boone that would later become famous as the Orphan Brigade. The battery saw its first minor action on the advance into Kentucky led by General Simon B. Buckner. Byrne's Battery, along with the 2nd Kentucky Infantry, led the advance into Kentucky late in 1861 and captured guns and men along the way, along with many of the pro-Union Homeguard of Kentucky and some of regular and volunteer troops. This advance led to the capture of Bowling Green and the subsequent set-up of the later exiled Confederate Government of Kentucky.

After the withdrawal from Kentucky, Byrne's battery saw heavy action at the Battle of Shiloh, where the battery was in danger of being overrun. The battery recovered its position to support Daniel Ruggles' assault on the "Hornet's Nest" as part of Ruggles' Grand Battery. Because of its tremendous losses at Shilon, Byrne's Battery was forced to disband and disperse itself amongst the other Kentucky units and even units outside the Orphan Brigade in May 1862. Most were simply directly transferred to Lyon's (Cobb's) 1st Kentucky Artillery Battery.

After their disbandment, Edward Byrne was commissioned a colonel and placed in command of all Kentucky cavalry companies not already organized into regiments. Byrne was ordered to report to General Morgan after the organization of these companies. But this did not satisfy Byrne and he requested permission to form another battery and be made Chief of Artillery of Morgan's cavalry. His request was granted, but his commission was amended by Confederate Congress to that of a Major. He began forming this new battery from elements of his old battery and from new recruits from Kentucky.

Byrne went on to serve with distinction under Morgan and commanded the artillery on several of his raids until he was court-martialed for his involvement in a bank robbery on one of those raids. The men not transferred back to his new unit continued to serve in various units. The 1st Kentucky Artillery Battery, having had other batteries including Cobb's battery merged into it, was surrendered by Confederate Lieutenant General Richard Taylor at Citronelle, Alabama on May 4, 1865.

== See also ==
- List of Kentucky Civil War Confederate units
