= 5th Kentucky Infantry Regiment (Confederate) =

- Active: October 21, 1861 – May 7, 1865
- Country: Confederate States of America
- Branch: Confederate States Army; Infantry & Mounted Infantry
- Engagements: Battle of Ivy Mountain; Battle of Middle Creek; Battle of Princeton; Battle of Chickamauga; Atlanta campaign Battle of Ringgold Gap; Battle of Resaca; Battle of Dallas; Battle of Kennesaw Mountain; Battle of Peachtree Creek; Battle of Atlanta; Battle of Jonesboro; Sherman's March to the Sea

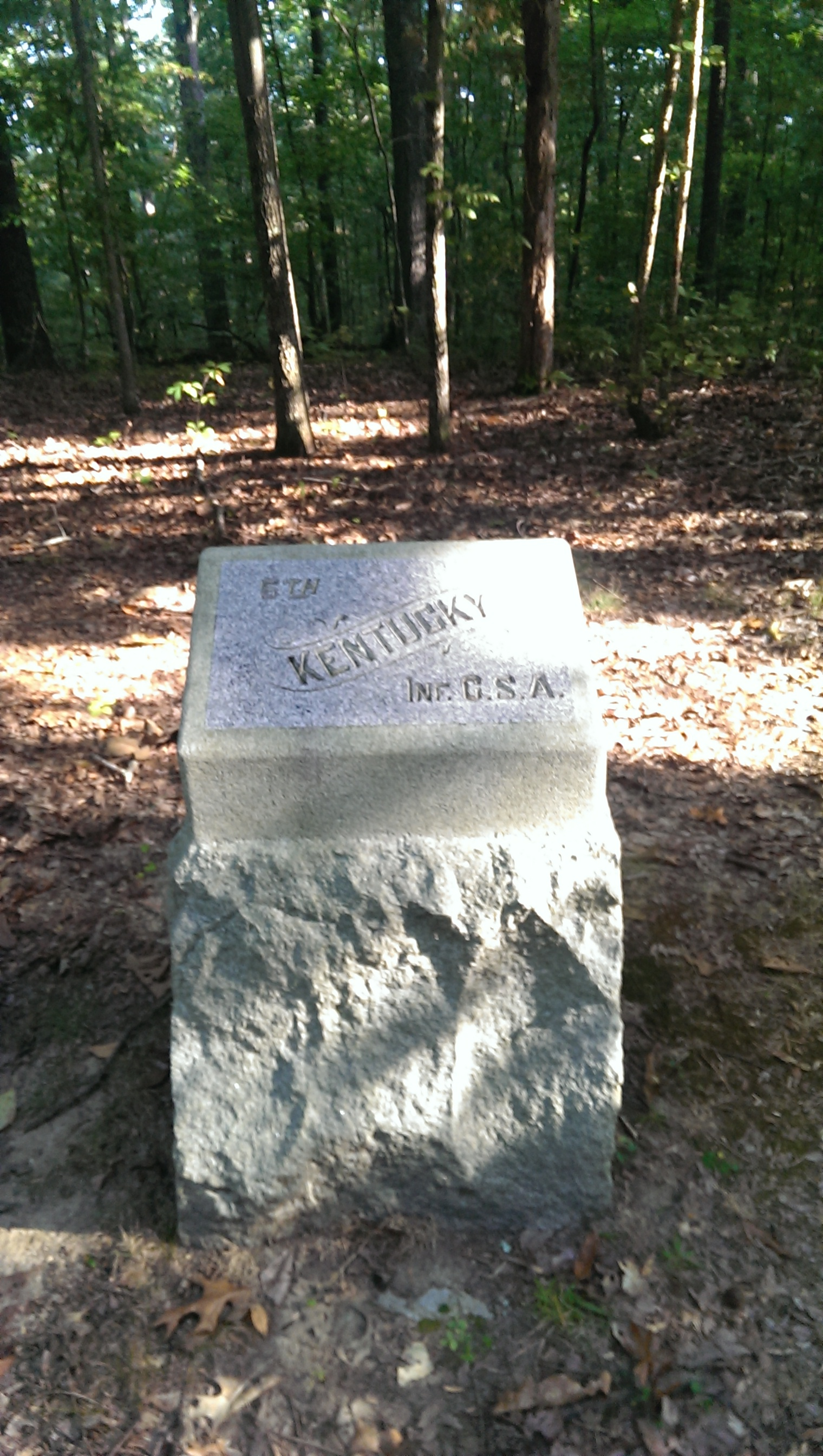
5th Kentucky, C.S.A., Chickamauga marker, commemorating the regiment's advance on the right flank of the Union position on Snodgrass Hill

The 5th Kentucky Infantry Regiment was an infantry regiment that served in the Confederate States Army during the American Civil War. In 1863 it became part of the First Kentucky Brigade.

== Service ==
The 5th Kentucky Infantry, initially recruited in Hager Hill, Kentucky, was organized October 21, 1861, at Prestonsburg, Kentucky and mustered in under the command of Colonel John Stuart Williams.

The regiment saw action in eastern Kentucky early in the war serving in the Army of Eastern Kentucky under Brig. Gen. Humphrey Marshall. On October 20, 1862, Marshall disbanded the regiment in a field just outside Hazel Green, Kentucky and gave the men three choices: honorable discharge, reenlist in the new regiment, or transfer to one of the cavalry regiments. In May 1863, command of the army passed to Brig. Gen. William Preston and was moved to Knoxville, Tennessee, becoming a division in Lt. Gen. Simon B. Buckner's Army of Tennessee.

Following the Battle of Chickamauga, the 5th Kentucky Infantry was transferred to the First Kentucky Brigade, remaining in that organization until the end of the war. The First Kentucky Brigade became part of the Atlanta campaign on May 7, 1864, when they left their winter camps at Dalton, Georgia and took up positions on Rocky Face Ridge. The regiment became part of the fighting retreating force as Maj. Gen. William T. Sherman pushed the Confederates further back toward Atlanta. At the Battle of Dallas near New Hope Church, the First Kentucky Brigade made an unsupported charge, losing 51% of its strength. At the Battle of Jonesboro on August 31, 1864, the brigade was ordered to attack the entrenched federal position. At an unseen deep ravine, the attack came to a halt. The following day, the Confederates were overwhelmed when two-thirds of a Union Army division attacked and began to surround their positions. Many of the men of the 2nd Kentucky Infantry, 6th Kentucky Infantry, and 9th Kentucky Infantry were captured. The remnants of the brigade fell back and managed a successful defense against the Union assault, bringing it to a halt. On September 4, only 500 men were present for duty in the entire First Kentucky Brigade. That same month, the regiment was converted to mounted infantry.

The regiment was engaged in delaying tactics during Sherman's March to the Sea, following him all the way to Savannah, Georgia, finally moving to Augusta, Georgia, in early 1865. The regiment's last engagement was on April 29, 1865, in a skirmish near Stateburg, South Carolina. The regiment was ordered to Washington, Georgia and surrendered on May 7, 1865.

== Commanders ==
- Colonel John Stuart Williams
- Colonel Andrew Jackson May
- Colonel Hiram Hawkins

== Notable members ==
- Captain Martin Van Buren Bates
- Thomas Boston Gordon

== See also ==
- List of Kentucky Civil War Confederate units
- Kentucky in the Civil War
