= List of Kentucky units in the American Civil War =

List of Kentucky Civil War units may refer to:

- List of Kentucky Union Civil War units
- List of Kentucky Confederate Civil War units
