= Camp Boone =

Army of Tennessee
- 1864 standardization flag
- Active: November 1862 - April 1865
- Country: Confederate States of America
- Branch: Confederate States Army
- Role: Premier Confederate Army in Western Theater
- Engagements: American Civil War

Camp Boone, Tennessee was located on Guthrie Road/ (Wilma Rudolph Boulevard) U.S. Route 79 near the Kentucky - Tennessee border at Clarksville, Montgomery County, Tennessee (in the area formerly known as Saint Bethlehem, Tennessee, before annexation by Clarksville, Tennessee). Kentucky had declared itself neutral in the war, and the site just inside Tennessee provided a place for pro-Confederate Kentuckians to organize their regiments without violating their state's neutrality.

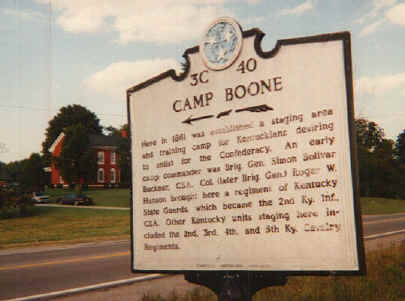
Tennessee State Historical Marker #3C 40 located on US Hwy 79 East (Guthrie Road) in Clarksville, Tennessee, indicating the location of Camp Boone

Camp Boone was laid out in early 1861 by three men who had been authorized to raise a Kentucky Regiment for Confederate service. These were William T. Withers, Robert A. Johnson (of Louisville, Kentucky) and James Moss (of Columbus, Kentucky). They were soon joined by Robert J. Breckenridge Jr. (of Lexington, Kentucky) and Lloyd Tilghman (of Paducah, Kentucky).

Confederate President Jefferson Davis appointed William Temple "Temp" Withers, a native of Kentucky and a veteran of the Mexican War then living in Mississippi, to assist with recruiting from Kentucky. Withers was temporarily given the rank General and placed in command of Camp Boone.

Another early camp commander was Simon Bolivar Buckner, a colonel and later brigadier general, who would eventually become the 30th Governor of Kentucky. Roger W. Hanson brought in a regiment of Kentucky State Guards, which then became the Confederacy's 2nd Kentucky Infantry Regiment. Other Kentucky units which had their start there included the 2nd, 3rd, 4th, and 5th Kentucky Cavalry Regiments.

The site chosen for Camp Boone was excellent. Its location was only 3.5 miles by road from the Kentucky-Tennessee state line, and slightly more than a mile from a Memphis, Clarksville and Louisville Railroad line that still in use today, owned and operated by the R.J. Corman Railroad Group. Fresh water was obtained from Spring Creek, which was fed by a cool spring and flowed around the camp on two sides.

Camp Boone was a major training site and staging area for the Confederate States of America Army of Tennessee, and many of the Kentuckians who joined the Confederate States Army began their service at Camp Boone. The 2nd Kentucky Infantry mustered at Camp Boone 17 July 1861, commanded by Colonel James B. Hawes of Lexington, Kentucky, while the 3rd Kentucky Infantry mustered three days later under the command of Colonel Lloyd Tilghman of Paducah, Kentucky.

A Tennessee Historical Commission marker #3C 40 marks the location of the civil war camp today at US Highway 79 east (Guthrie Road) Clarksville, Tennessee.

== See also ==
- List of Kentucky Civil War Confederate units
- List of Kentucky Civil War Units
- Kentucky in the Civil War
- History of Tennessee
- List of archaeological sites in Tennessee
- Tennessee in the American Civil War
