= 7th Kentucky Infantry Regiment (Confederate) =

- Active: September 1861 – May 4, 1865
- Country: Confederate States of America
- Branch: Confederate States Army
- Type: Infantry & Mounted Infantry
- Engagements: Battle of Shiloh; Siege of Corinth; Battle of Corinth; Battle of Baton Rouge; Battle of Stones River; Vicksburg Campaign; Battle of Champion Hill; Battle of Big Black River Bridge; Siege of Jackson; Battle of Paducah; Battle of Brice's Crossroads; Battle of Spring Hill; Battle of Franklin; Battle of Nashville; Wilson's Raid; Battle of Selma

The 7th Kentucky Infantry Regiment was an infantry regiment that served in the Confederate States Army during the American Civil War.

== Service ==
The 7th Kentucky Infantry was organized in September 1861, at Camp Burnett near Clinton, Kentucky, under the command of Colonel Charles Wickliffe.

Early in the war, the regiment performed provost guard duty at Paducah, Kentucky. In February 1862, the regiment was assigned to a brigade and moved south to Corinth, Mississippi. At the Battle of Shiloh, the regiment was brigaded with a battalion of the 1st Tennessee Infantry, 6th Tennessee Infantry, 9th Tennessee Infantry, and Smith's Battery (Mississippi). On the second day of the battle, Col. Wickliffe was mortally wounded when the regiment was ordered to reinforce the left flank of their brigade. Brigade commander Brig. Gen. George Maney stated, "I directed Colonel Wickliffe, of the Seventh Kentucky, who rendered me most efficient service by his activity and gallantry, the re-enforce[ment of] our left. He did as directed and received his fatal wound at the head of a charge, doing his whole duty as a devoted patriot and gallant soldier." Wickliffe died ten days later near Jackson, Tennessee. Wickliffe was a nephew and namesake of Kentucky's 14th governor, Charles A. Wickliffe, a staunch Unionist.

Following Shiloh, the 7th Kentucky Infantry moved south and participated in the Corinth Campaign and the Battle of Baton Rouge. The regiment then remained at Port Hudson, Louisiana, until August 20, 1862, when it and the 3rd Kentucky Infantry and 8th Kentucky Infantry became part of the Army of Tennessee. The 7th Kentucky Infantry were en route to Bragg at Tullahoma, Tennessee, when they were ordered to reinforce Lt. Gen. John C. Pemberton in the defenses of Vicksburg, Mississippi.

By early 1864, the regiment's strength was severely depleted. The 7th Kentucky Infantry was ordered to report to Lt. Gen. Nathan Bedford Forrest. Horses were unavailable, so the men followed Forrest on foot. The Kentucky troops that accompanied Forrest were divided into four brigades. The 7th Kentucky Infantry was in the third brigade with the 3rd Kentucky Infantry, 8th Kentucky Infantry, and 12th Kentucky Infantry, commanded by Colonel A. P. Thompson. On March 15, 1864, Forrest moved north toward Paducah, Kentucky. Three miles from Paducah they encountered Union pickets and pushed them back to their camp on the outskirts of town. Under fire from a nearby fort, the Kentuckians moved through the streets of Paducah. The fort was discovered to be impenetrable, and a retreat was ordered. Col. Thompson was killed by cannon fire while leading his troops. Forrest soon returned to Mississippi where the regiment was engaged at the Battle of Brice's Crossroads. At some point in the campaign to Kentucky, the regiment was mounted, becoming the 7th Kentucky Mounted Infantry.

The regiment surrendered on May 4, 1865, at Columbus, Mississippi.

== Commanders ==
- Colonel Charles Wickliffe - mortally wounded at the battle of Shiloh
- Colonel Edward Crossland

== See also ==
- List of Kentucky Civil War Confederate units
- Kentucky in the Civil War
