= Benjamin Hardin Helm =

Confederate Army general (1831–1863)

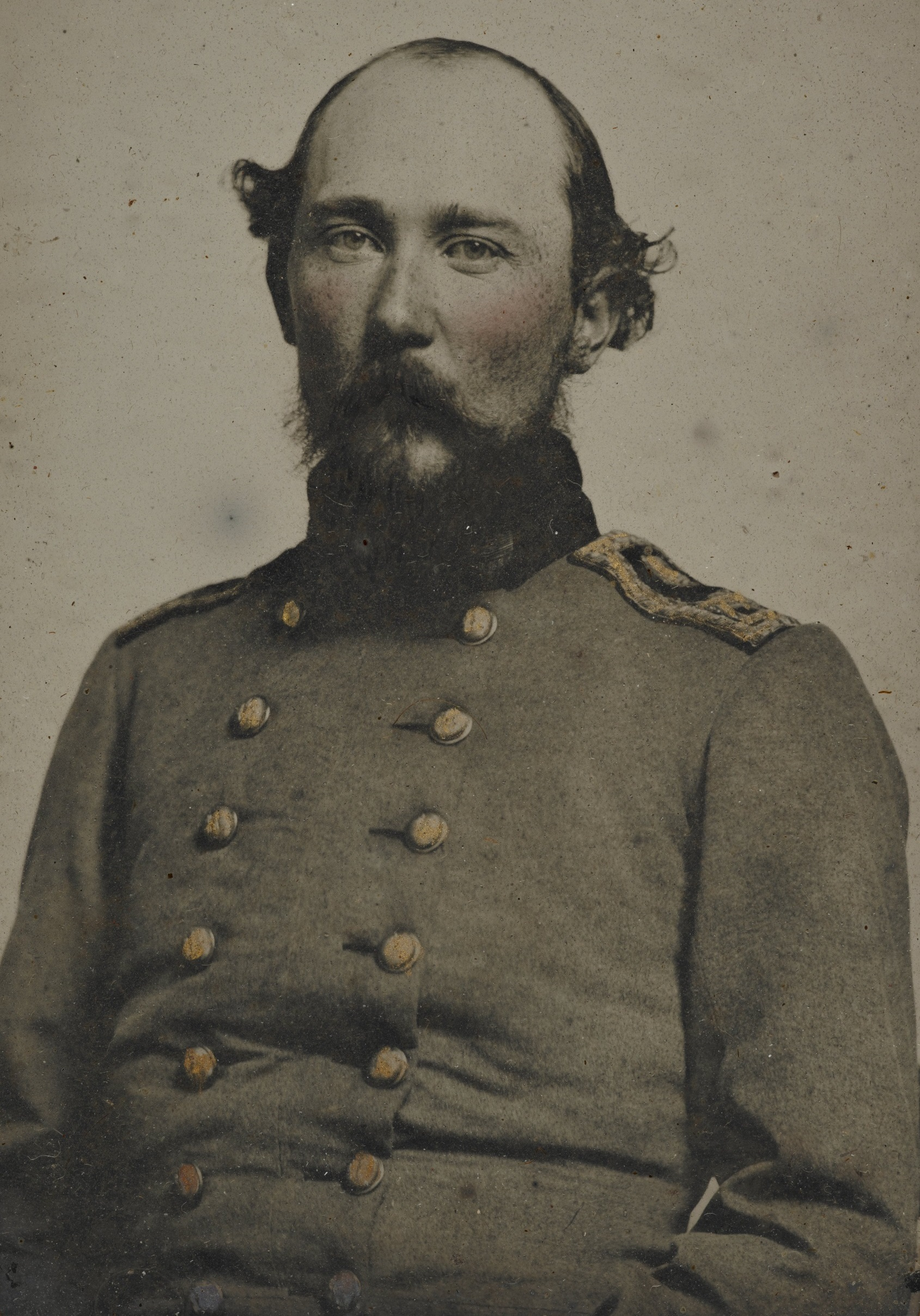
- Born: June 2, 1831; Bardstown, Kentucky, U.S.
- Died: September 21, 1863 (aged 32); Chickamauga, Georgia, C.S.
- Burial place: Helm Family Cemetery, Elizabethtown, Kentucky
- Military career
- Allegiance: United States of America; Confederate States of America
- Branch: United States Army; Confederate States Army
- Service years: 1851–1852 (U.S.); 1861–1863 (C.S.)
- Rank: First Lieutenant; Brigadier General
- Commands: 1st Kentucky Cavalry; 1st Kentucky "Orphans" Brigade
- Conflicts: American Civil War

Member of the Kentucky House of Representatives from Hardin County
- In office August 6, 1855 – August 3, 1857 Serving with Robert B. English
- Preceded by: Jacob B. Haydon; Charles G. Wintersmith
- Succeeded by: Vene P. Armstrong; Wilford Lee Harned

Benjamin Hardin Helm (June 2, 1831 – September 21, 1863) was an American politician, attorney, and Confederate brigadier general. A son of Kentucky governor John L. Helm, he was born in Bardstown, Kentucky. He attended the Kentucky Military Institute and the West Point Military Academy and then studied law at the University of Louisville and Harvard University. He served as a state legislator and the state's attorney in Kentucky. Helm was offered the position of Union Army paymaster by his brother-in-law, President Abraham Lincoln (Helm was married to Emilie Todd, the half-sister of Mary Todd Lincoln), a position which he declined. Helm joined the Confederate States Army. As a brigadier general, Helm commanded the 1st Kentucky Brigade, more commonly known as The Orphan Brigade. He died on the battlefield during the Battle of Chickamauga.

== Early life ==
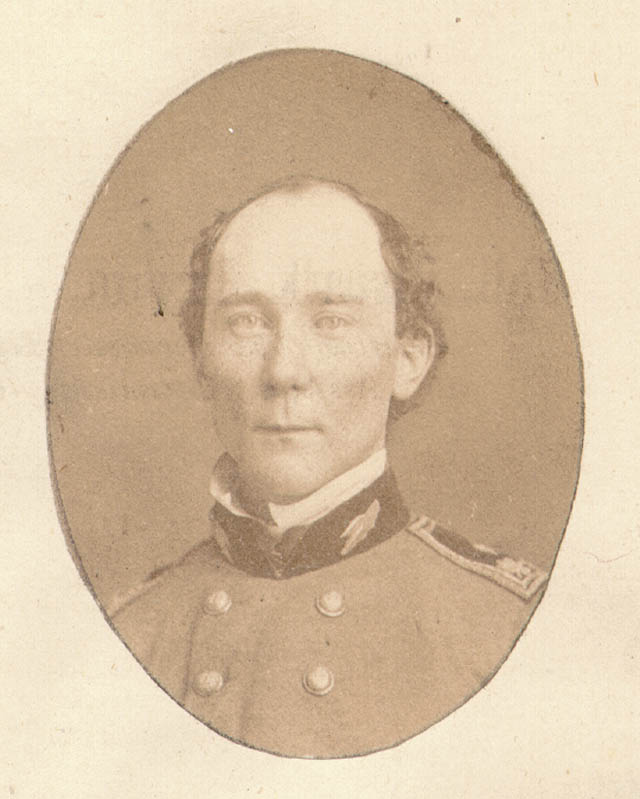
Helm during his Kentucky State Guard service, 1860.

The son of lawyer and politician John L. Helm and Lucinda Barbour Hardin, Benjamin Hardin Helm was born in Bardstown, Kentucky on June 2, 1831. In the winter of 1846, at age 15, Helm enrolled at the Kentucky Military Institute, where he remained for three months. He left on his 16th birthday to accept an appointment at West Point the same day. Helm graduated in 1851 near his 20th birthday, ranked 9th in a class of 42 cadets. He became a brevet second lieutenant in the 2nd U.S. Dragoons. He served at a cavalry school at Carlisle, Pennsylvania, and at Fort Lincoln, Texas, but resigned his commission after a year, when he was diagnosed with inflammatory rheumatism.

Helm then studied law at the University of Louisville and Harvard University, graduating in 1853 and practicing law with his father. In 1855, he was elected to the House of Representatives of Kentucky from Hardin County, and was the state's attorney for the 3rd district of Kentucky from 1856 to 1858. On March 26, 1856, Helm married Emilie Pariet Todd, daughter of Robert Todd of Lexington and a half-sister of Mary Todd Lincoln.

In 1860, he was appointed assistant inspector-general of the Kentucky State Guard, which he was active in organizing. Kentucky remained officially neutral at the start of the American Civil War, but his brother-in-law, now President Abraham Lincoln, offered him the position of paymaster of the Union Army. Helm declined the offer, and returned to Kentucky to raise the 1st Kentucky Cavalry Regiment for the Confederate Army.

== Military career ==
Helm was commissioned a colonel on October 19, 1861, and served under Brigadier General Simon B. Buckner in Bowling Green, Kentucky. Helm and the 1st Kentucky Cavalry were then ordered south.

While the Confederate Army launched its surprise attack at Shiloh, Helm's regiment performed detached service in northern Alabama, where it patrolled the Tennessee River and safeguarded the extreme right of the Confederate operations from being flanked by potential Union approaches from central Tennessee. This service earned Helm a promotion to brigadier general, backed-dated to March 14, 1862. Three weeks later, he received a new assignment to raise the 3rd Kentucky Brigade, in the division of Major General John C. Breckinridge.

Following Shiloh, Helm was sent to Yazoo City, Mississippi to provide protection for the construction of the CSS Arkansas- a new ironclad for the Confederate Navy- to be completed.

Still commanding a brigade under Breckinridge, Helm sustained serious injuries at the Battle of Baton Rouge (1862) when his horse fell on him; crushing his leg and causing internal injuries that would prevent him from active service for several months. He recuperated in Chattanooga to recover. During this time he was briefly was assigned the administrative role commanding the Eastern District of the Confederate Department of the Gulf.

By January 1863, Helm was deemed fit to return to service, and left Chattanooga to rejoin the Army at Tullahoma. On his arrival on January 31, he was given command of the First Kentucky Brigade, commonly known as the "Orphan Brigade", after its commander, Roger W. Hanson, had just been killed at the Battle of Stones River.

Helm's brigade was part of John C. Breckinridge's division in the Army of Tennessee, where it participated in the 1863 Tullahoma and Chickamauga campaigns.

In May 1863, Breckinridge's division was ordered to Mississippi to assist in General Joseph E. Johnston's unsuccessful attempt to break the siege. Helm called it "the most unpleasant and trying [campaign] of his career".

== Battle of Chickamauga and death ==
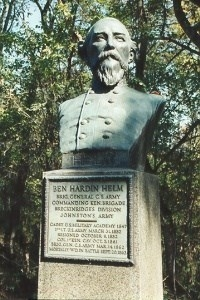
Bust of Helm by Anton Schaaf at Vicksburg National Military Park, 1914

In the fall of 1863, the 1st Kentucky Brigade formed a part of General Braxton Bragg's counteroffensive against Union Major General William Rosecrans at the Battle of Chickamauga. At 9:30 am on September 20, 1863, the divisions of Generals Breckinridge and Patrick Cleburne were ordered to move forward. Helm's brigade and the others in Breckinridge's division drove into the Federals' left. General Cleburne's division, which was intended to strike near the center of the line, was delayed by heavy fire from Union soldiers, leaving the left flank unguarded. Repeated attempts to overwhelm the Federals were in vain, though some of Helm's Kentuckians and Alabamians managed to reach within 39 yards (36 m) of the Federal line. In less than an hour of the order given to advance, fully one third of the Orphan Brigade had been lost. While the remainder of Helm's men clashed with the Union line he was hit by an artillery shell fragment Bleeding profusely, he remained in the saddle a few moments before toppling to the ground. After being carried off the battlefield, Helm's surgeons concluded that his wounds would be fatal. Helm clung to life for several hours. Knowing that his health was deteriorating, he asked who had won the battle. When assured that the Confederates had carried the day, he muttered: "Victory!, Victory!, Victory!". On September 21, 1863, Gen. Helm succumbed to his wounds.

Following his death, Abraham Lincoln and his wife went into private mourning at the White House. Mary Lincoln's niece recalled: "She knew that a single tear shed for a dead enemy would bring torrents of scorn and bitter abuse on both her husband and herself." However, the widowed Emilie Todd Helm was granted safe passage to the White House in December 1863.

In an official report of the Battle of Chickamauga, General Daniel Harvey Hill stated that Benjamin Helm's "gallantry and loveliness of character endeared him to everyone." In a letter to Emilie Todd Helm, General Breckinridge said, "Your husband commanded them [the men of the Orphan brigade] like a thorough soldier. He loved them, they loved him, and he died at their head, a patriot and a hero."

== See also ==
- List of American Civil War generals (Confederate)
