= 4th Kentucky Infantry Regiment (Confederate) =

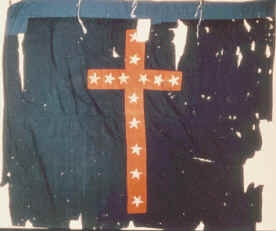
- Regimental flag of the 4th Kentucky Infantry Regiment courtesy of the National Park Service
- Active: August 1861 – May 7, 1865
- Country: Confederate States of America
- Branch: Confederate States Army; Infantry & Mounted Infantry
- Equipment: M1853 Enfield Rifles
- Engagements: Battle of Shiloh; Battle of Stones River; Battle of Chickamauga; Battle of Missionary Ridge; Atlanta campaign Battle of Rocky Face Ridge; Battle of Resaca; Battle of Dallas; Battle of Kennesaw Mountain; Battle of Peachtree Creek; Battle of Atlanta; Battle of Utoy Creek; Battle of Jonesboro; Sherman's March to the Sea; Carolinas campaign

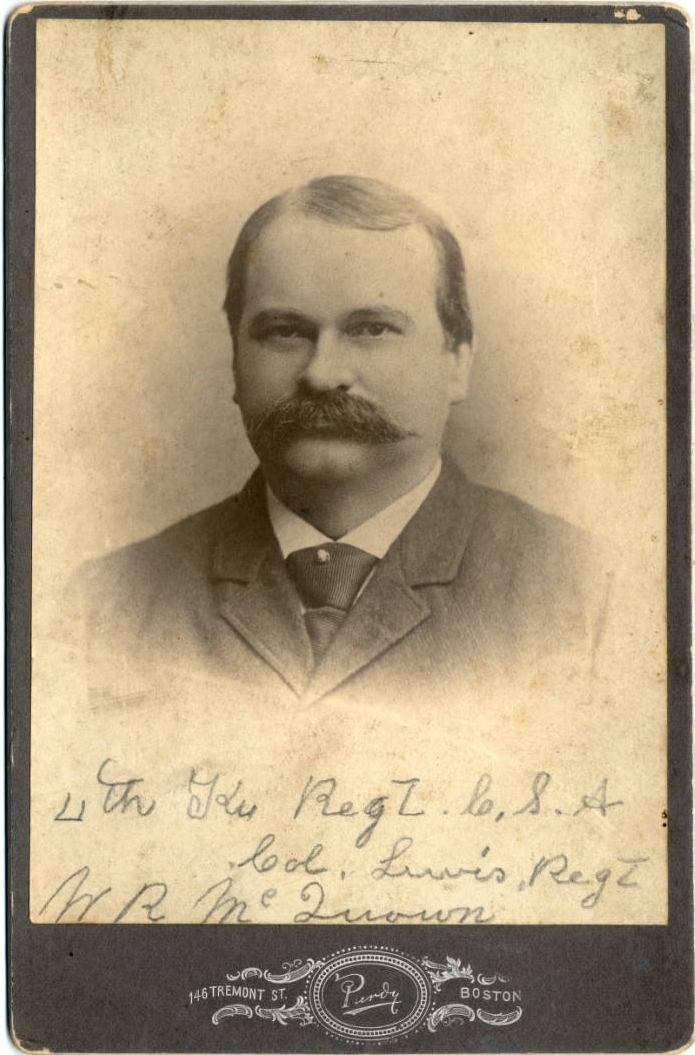
Composer William R. McQuown was the 4th Kentucky's band director

The 4th Kentucky Infantry Regiment was an infantry regiment that served in the Confederate States Army during the American Civil War. It was part of the First Kentucky Brigade.

== Service ==
The 4th Kentucky Infantry was organized on September 13, 1861, at Camp Burnett in Montgomery, Tennessee, under the command of Colonel Robert P. Trabue.

After organization and muster, the regiment moved north into Kentucky and camped at Bowling Green, where it remained until early 1862. The 4th Kentucky Infantry first saw combat at the Battle of Shiloh in April 1862, losing 49% of its strength in the two-day battle. The regiment fell back to Corinth, Mississippi, after the battle and was next ordered to Vicksburg, Mississippi, to aid in the city's defense. The 4th Kentucky soon received orders to reinforce General Braxton Bragg, whose troops were engaged in the Kentucky Campaign. The regiment was north of Knoxville, Tennessee, 20 miles from Cumberland Gap, when it received orders to return to Murfreesboro, Tennessee, because of Bragg's subsequent retreat after the Battle of Perryville on October 8, 1862.

The 4th Kentucky came under heavy fire at the Battle of Stones River on January 2, 1863. Ordered by Bragg to attack an area that division commander Maj. Gen. John C. Breckinridge had already reconnoitered and decided was to be too heavily defended, the First Kentucky Brigade nevertheless led the charge. Initially successful, the attackers soon encountered heavy Union Army artillery fire. The 4th Kentucky lost several men, including two color-bearers, but it fared better than the brigade's other regiments. Brigade commander Brigadier General Roger Hanson was mortally wounded in the attack.

Later that year, the First Kentucky Brigade was ordered back to Vicksburg, to help relieve the siege. The brigade had not arrived when Vicksburg surrendered on July 4, 1863, so it fell back to Jackson, Mississippi, where it was attacked in mid-July. During the Battle of Chickamauga, the 4th Kentucky and 6th Kentucky Infantry charged a part of the federal line defended by the Union's 15th Kentucky Infantry and Bridges' Illinois Battery. The Kentucky Confederates routed the infantry and captured two of Bridge's cannons, turning them against the fleeing enemy. Weeks later, the 4th Kentucky was called upon to guard the Confederate army's rear following the Battle of Missionary Ridge. Bragg's army retreated to Dalton, Georgia and went into winter quarters.

The First Kentucky Brigade took part in the Atlanta campaign on May 7, 1864, when they left their winter camps and took up positions on Rocky Face Ridge. The regiment became part of the fighting retreating force as Maj. Gen. William T. Sherman pushed the Confederates further back toward Atlanta. The First Kentucky Brigade made an unsupported charge at the Battle of Dallas near New Hope Church, losing 51% of its strength. At the Battle of Jonesboro on August 31, 1864, the brigade was ordered to attack the entrenched federal position. The attack came to a halt at an unseen deep ravine, where the 4th Kentucky Infantry lost its original color-bearer, who had carried the flag since the beginning of the war. The next day, the brigade was overwhelmed, when two-thirds of a Union Army division attacked and began to surround their positions. Many of the men of the 2nd Kentucky Infantry, 6th Kentucky Infantry, and 9th Kentucky Infantry were captured. The remnants of the brigade fell back and managed to bring the Union attack to a halt. Only 500 men were present for duty in the entire First Kentucky Brigade on September 4.

The 4th Kentucky was then ordered to Griffin, Georgia and converted to mounted infantry. The regiment engaged in delaying tactics during Sherman's March to the Sea, following him all the way to Savannah, Georgia, finally moving to Augusta, Georgia, in early 1865. Its last engagement was on April 29, 1865, in a skirmish near Stateburg, South Carolina. At the close of the war, the 4th Kentucky was ordered to Washington, Georgia and surrendered on May 7, 1865.

== Commanders ==
- Colonel Robert P. Trabue - died February 1863
- Colonel Joseph P. Nuckols - commanded at the battle of Chickamauga
- Colonel Thomas W. Thompson - commanded at the battle of Chickamauga as major

== See also ==
- List of Kentucky Civil War Confederate units
- Kentucky in the Civil War
