= 6th Kentucky Infantry Regiment (Confederate) =

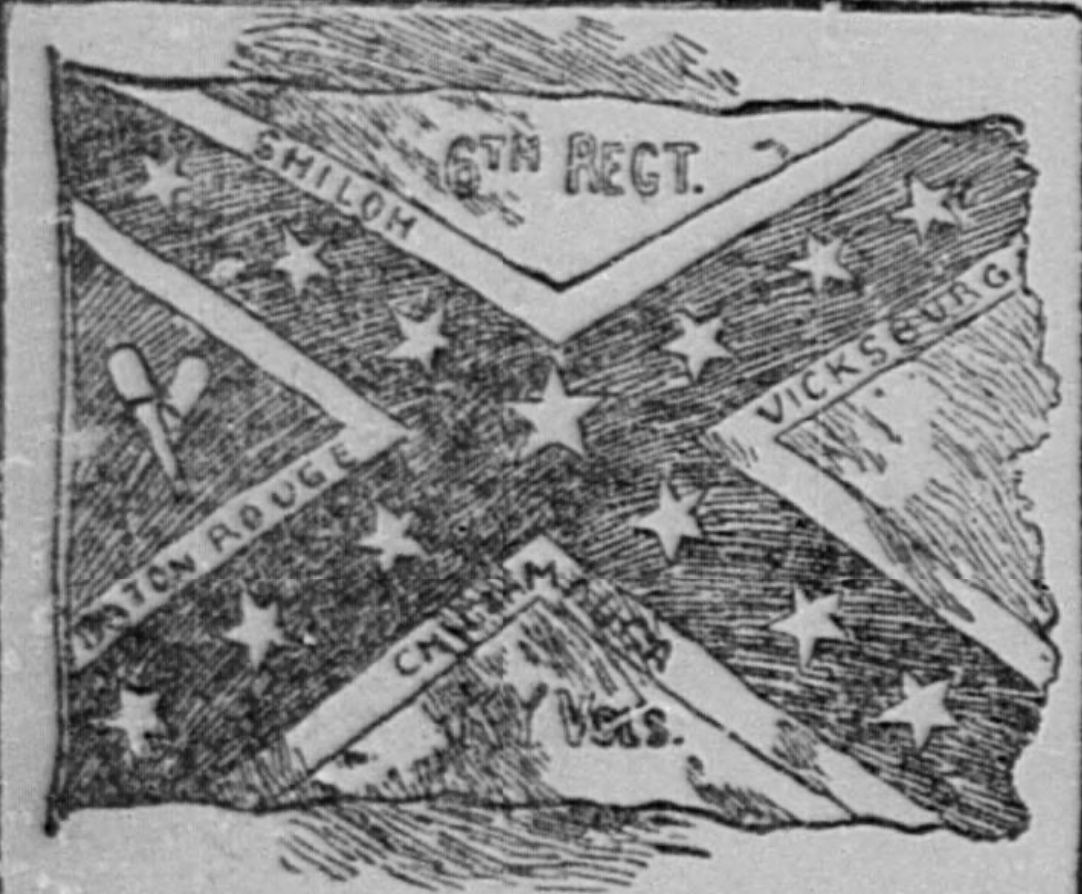
- Regimantal Flag
- Active: November 19, 1861 – May 7, 1865
- Country: Confederate States of America
- Branch: Confederate States Army
- Type: Infantry & Mounted Infantry
- Regimantal flag: Flag of the 6th Kentucky Infantry Regiment (Confederate).png
- Engagements: Battle of Shiloh; Battle of Baton Rouge; Battle of Stones River; Defense of Vicksburg; Siege of Jackson; Battle of Chickamauga; Atlanta campaign Battle of Ringgold Gap; Battle of Resaca; Battle of Dallas; Battle of Kennesaw Mountain; Battle of Peachtree Creek; Battle of Atlanta; Battle of Jonesboro; Sherman's March to the Sea

The 6th Kentucky Infantry Regiment was an infantry regiment that served in the Confederate States Army during the American Civil War. It was formed from Nelson, Barren, and surrounding counties. It was also part of the First Kentucky Brigade.

== Service ==
The 6th Kentucky Infantry was organized November 19, 1861, at Bowling Green, Kentucky and mustered in under the command of Colonel Joseph Horace Lewis.

At the Battle of Shiloh, the regiment was brigaded with the 4th Alabama Infantry Battalion, 31st Alabama Infantry, 3rd Kentucky Infantry, 4th Kentucky Infantry, and 9th Kentucky Infantry. The regiment retreated to Corinth, Mississippi, after the battle and was ordered to Vicksburg, Mississippi, to aid in the defenses there.

The regiment remained at Port Hudson, Louisiana, until August 20, 1862, when it was ordered to Jackson, Mississippi. Later, Maj. Gen. John C. Breckinridge was ordered to take the 4th Kentucky Infantry, 6th Kentucky Infantry, and 9th Kentucky Infantry with him and report to Gen. Braxton Bragg.

The regiment came under heavy fire at the Battle of Stones River on January 2, 1863. Having been ordered by Bragg to attack an area that division commander Maj. Gen. Breckinridge had reconnoitered and determined to be too heavily defended, the First Kentucky Brigade led the charge. Although initially successful, the brigade was met by heavy Union Army artillery fire. In which the brigade lost 51% of those that were active in the charge. Brigade commander Brig. Gen. Roger Hanson was also mortally wounded in the attack.

Later that same year, the First Kentucky Brigade was ordered back to Vicksburg, to help relieve the siege. The brigade arrived after the fall of Vicksburg on July 4, 1863, and fell back to Jackson, Mississippi, where they were attacked in mid-July. At the Battle of Chickamauga the 4th Kentucky Infantry and 6th Kentucky Infantry charged a part of the federal line, defended by the 15th Kentucky Infantry and Bridges' Illinois Battery. The two regiments routed the infantry and captured two cannons, turning them on the fleeing enemy. Weeks later, the 6th Kentucky Infantry was called upon to guard the Confederate army's retreat following the Battle of Missionary Ridge. The army retreated to Dalton, Georgia and went into winter quarters.

The First Kentucky Brigade became part of the Atlanta campaign on May 7, 1864, when they left their winter camps at Dalton, Georgia and took up positions on Rocky Face Ridge. The regiment became part of the fighting retreating force as Maj. Gen. William T. Sherman pushed the Confederates further back toward Atlanta. At the Battle of Dallas near New Hope Church, the First Kentucky Brigade made an unsupported charge, losing 51% of its strength. At the Battle of Jonesboro on August 31, 1864, the brigade was ordered to attack the entrenched federal position. At an unseen deep ravine, the attack came to a halt. The following day, the Confederates were overwhelmed when two-thirds of a Union Army division attacked and began to surround their positions. Many of the men of the 2nd Kentucky Infantry, 6th Kentucky Infantry, and 9th Kentucky Infantry were captured. The remnants of the brigade fell back and managed a successful defense against the Union assault, bringing it to a halt. On September 4, only 500 men were present for duty in the entire First Kentucky Brigade. That same month, the regiment was converted to mounted infantry at Griffin, Georgia.

The regiment was engaged in delaying tactics during Sherman's March to the Sea, following him all the way to Savannah, Georgia, finally moving to Augusta, Georgia, in early 1865. The regiment's last engagement was on April 29, 1865, in a skirmish near Stateburg, South Carolina. The regiment was ordered to Washington, Georgia and surrendered on May 7, 1865.

== Commanders ==
- Colonel Joseph Horace Lewis - promoted to brigadier general, commander of the First Kentucky Brigade
- Colonel Martin H. Cofer - commanded at the battle of Chickamauga as lieutenant colonel

== See also ==
- List of Kentucky Civil War Confederate units
- Kentucky in the Civil War
