= Thomas Boston Gordon =

American lawyer and educator (1816–1891)

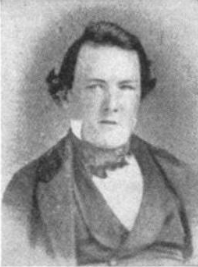
- Thomas Boston Gordon, 1859
- Born: February 4, 1816; Elbert County, Georgia, U.S.
- Died: January 25, 1891 (aged 74); Lexington, Kentucky, U.S.
- Education: Miami University
- Occupations: Educator, attorney, and judge
- Known for: Founding Beta Theta Pi

Thomas Boston Gordon (February 4, 1816 – January 25, 1891) was an American educator, attorney, and county judge in Kentucky. He was a founding member of Beta Theta Pi national fraternity.

== Biography ==
Gordon was born in Elbert County, Georgia. He attended Miami University, receiving an A.B. in 1840 and an A.M. in 1841 or 1845. While there, he and seven other male students formed Beta Theta Pi national fraternity at Miami University on August 8, 1839. He was the fraternity's second president. In April 1840, he was part of the committee that formed the fraternity's Beta chapter at the University of Cincinnati. He was also a member of the Erodelphian Literary Society.

== Career ==
From 1841 to 1843, Gordon was the principal of the Collingsworth Institute near Talbotton, Georgia. In November 1845, he represented Monroe County, Georgia in the Democratic Convention of the Third Congressional District. He studied law in Forsythe, Georgia and was admnitted to the State Bar of Georgia in February 1842 and began practicing law. Gordon was admitted to the Bar of the Supreme Court of Georgia in 1847. Gordon began practicing law in Owingsville, Kentucky by 1850. He was elected a judge in Bath County, Kentucky from 1854 to 1858.

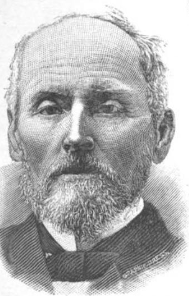
Thomas Boston Gordon, 1886

During the Civil War, he enrolled in the Confederate States Army in 1861 at the age of 45, along with his sons John and Angus who were fifteen and sixteen years old, respectively. Gordon initially served with Company C, 5th Kentucky Infantry. He became a captain in the First Kentucky Brigade, also known as the Orphan Brigade when Company C was transferred in the spring of 1863. However, he was transferred to a command in the cavalry. By January 1, 1865, Gordon has signed a bond, committing to peace and honoring the laws of the United States.

After the war, Gordon returned to Owingsville and the education profession. He took a position with a school in Pinckard Station in Woodford County and became the principal of Smithfield College in Smithfield in 1876. He retired from teaching in 1879.

== Personal life ==
Gordon married Frances Greer of Forsythe, Georgia on June 11, 1845. They moved to a farm in Bath County, Kentucky in 1848. They had six children, including Thomas R. Gordon who became a judge, Angus Neal Gordon who was a college professor, and Fannie I. Gordon who was a high school teacher.

Gordon was a Mason, serving as the master of the Maury Lodge in 1852. After he retired, Gordan and his wife moved to Fayette County; he spent his latter days in Nicholasville, Kentucky, near Lexington. In 1891, Gordon died from paralysis in the Lexington home of his son, Angus. He is buried in the Lexington Cemetery.

== See also ==
- List of Beta Theta Pi members
