= 9th Kentucky Infantry Regiment (Confederate) =

- Active: October 3, 1861 – May 7, 1865
- Country: Confederate States of America
- Allegiance: Confederate States Army
- Branch: Confederate States Army; Infantry & Mounted Infantry
- Engagements: Battle of Shiloh; Battle of Baton Rouge; Battle of Hartsville; Battle of Stones River; Vicksburg Campaign; Siege of Jackson; Battle of Chickamauga; Atlanta campaign Battle of Rocky Face Ridge; Battle of Resaca; Battle of Dallas; Battle of Kennesaw Mountain; Battle of Peachtree Creek; Battle of Atlanta; Battle of Utoy Creek; Battle of Jonesboro; Sherman's March to the Sea; Carolinas campaign

The 9th Kentucky Infantry Regiment was an infantry regiment that served in the Confederate States Army during the American Civil War. It was part of the First Kentucky Brigade.

== Service ==
The 9th Kentucky Infantry was organized October 3, 1861, in Bowling Green, Kentucky, under the command of Colonel Thomas H. Hunt and designated the 5th Kentucky Infantry; it did not complete organization until May 15, 1862. (It continued to be referred to as the 5th Kentucky Infantry or 5th (Hunt's) Kentucky Infantry during its existence and after the war.) Men were recruited in Harrison, Jefferson, Logan, Nelson, Ohio, and Scott counties. In 1863, Company I was transferred to the 5th Kentucky Infantry.

The regiment retreated to Corinth, Mississippi, after the Battle of Shiloh and was ordered to Vicksburg, Mississippi, to aid in the defenses there.

The regiment came under heavy fire at the Battle of Stones River on January 2, 1863. Having been ordered by Bragg to attack an area that division commander Maj. Gen. John C. Breckinridge had reconnoitered and determined to be too heavily defended, the First Kentucky Brigade led the charge. Although initially successful, the brigade was met by heavy Union Army artillery fire. Brigade commander Brig. Gen. Roger Hanson was also mortally wounded in the attack. The 9th Kentucky Infantry lost one killed and twenty-eight wounded in the battle.

Later that same year, the First Kentucky Brigade was ordered back to Vicksburg, to help relieve the siege. The brigade arrived after the fall of Vicksburg on July 4, 1863, and fell back to Jackson, Mississippi, where they were attacked in mid-July. At the Battle of Chickamauga the regiment lost 44% of its strength of 230 engaged. Weeks later, the 9th Kentucky Infantry was called upon to guard the Confederate army's retreat following the Battle of Missionary Ridge. The army retreated to Dalton, Georgia and went into winter quarters.

The First Kentucky Brigade became part of the Atlanta campaign on May 7, 1864, when they left their winter camps and took up positions on Rocky Face Ridge. The regiment became part of the fighting retreating force as Maj. Gen. William T. Sherman pushed the Confederates further back toward Atlanta. At the Battle of Dallas near New Hope Church, the First Kentucky Brigade made an unsupported charge, losing 51% of its strength. At the Battle of Jonesboro on August 31, 1864, the brigade was ordered to attack the entrenched federal position. At an unseen deep ravine, the attack came to a halt. The following day, the Confederates were overwhelmed when two-thirds of a Union Army division attacked and began to surround their positions. Many of the men of the 2nd Kentucky Infantry, 6th Kentucky Infantry, and 9th Kentucky Infantry were captured. The remnants of the brigade fell back and managed a successful defense against the Union assault, bringing it to a halt. On September 4, only 500 men were present for duty in the entire First Kentucky Brigade.

The 9th Kentucky Infantry was afterward ordered to Griffin, Georgia and converted to mounted infantry. The regiment was engaged in delaying tactics during Sherman's March to the Sea, following him all the way to Savannah, Georgia, finally moving to Augusta, Georgia, in early 1865. The regiment's last engagement was on April 29, 1865, in a skirmish near Stateburg, South Carolina. The regiment was ordered to Washington, Georgia and surrendered on May 7, 1865.

== Commanders ==
- Colonel Thomas H. Hunt - resigned April 1863
- Colonel John W. Caldwell
- Lieutenant Colonel Alexander Casseday
- Lieutenant Colonel Robert A. Johnston
- Lieutenant Colonel J. C. Wickliffe
- Major Benjamin Desha

== Notable members ==
- Private Jacob Blackshear, Company B - Confederate Roll of Honor, for action at the battle of Stones River
- Private Nathan Berryman Board, Company G - Confederate Roll of Honor, for action at the battles of Stones River and Chickamauga; mortally wounded at Chickamauga
- Corporal John W. Carroll, Company D - Confederate Roll of Honor, for action at the battle of Chickamauga
- Private James Luther "Lute" Collins, Company C - Confederate Roll of Honor, for action at the battle of Stones River
- Captain Joseph Desha, Company I - Confederate Roll of Honor, for action at the battles of Stones River and Chickamauga; named to the roll by his company after Stones River
- Corporal John Lewis Dunn, Company A - Confederate Roll of Honor, killed in action at the battle of Chickamauga
- Sergeant Drakeford Gray, Company I - Confederate Roll of Honor, for action at the battle of Stones River
- Private Norborn Galt Gray, Company B - Confederate Roll of Honor, for action at the battle of Chickamauga
- Sergeant William K. Kinman, Company H - Confederate Roll of Honor, for action at the battle of Stones River
- Private Andrew J. Kirtley, Company C - Confederate Roll of Honor, for action at the battle of Chickamauga
- Captain James T. Morehead, Company G - Confederate Roll of Honor, for action at the battle of Stones River
- Private H. B. Roberts, Company K - Confederate Roll of Honor, for action at the battle of Stones River
- Private Euclid C. Shull, Company C - Confederate Roll of Honor, for action at the battle of Ranney's Crossroads
- Private J. G. Wakefield, Company A - Confederate Roll of Honor, for action at the battle of Stones River

== See also ==
- List of Kentucky Civil War Confederate units
- Kentucky in the Civil War
