= 3rd Kentucky Infantry Regiment (Confederate) =

- Active: July 1861 – May 6, 1865
- Country: Confederate States of America
- Branch: Confederate States Army; Infantry & Mounted Infantry
- Engagements: Battle of Shiloh; Battle of Paducah; Battle of Raymond; Battle of Brice's Crossroads; Battle of Franklin

The 3rd Kentucky Infantry Regiment was a volunteer infantry regiment that served in the Confederate States Army during the American Civil War. It was part of the First Kentucky Brigade through August 1862.

== Service ==
The 3rd Kentucky Infantry was organized in July 1861, at Camp Boone in Montgomery, Tennessee, under the command of Colonel Lloyd Tilghman.

At the Battle of Shiloh, the regiment was brigaded with the 4th Alabama Infantry, 31st Alabama Infantry, 4th Kentucky Infantry, 6th Kentucky Infantry, and 9th Kentucky Infantry. In a charge on the Union Army lines, 174 men from the 3rd Kentucky Infantry were killed. All regimental officers were either killed or wounded.

The regiment remained at Port Hudson, Louisiana, until August 20, 1862, when it was ordered to Jackson, Mississippi. Major General John C. Breckinridge was ordered to take the 4th Kentucky Infantry, 6th Kentucky Infantry, and 9th Kentucky Infantry with him and report to General Braxton Bragg. The 3rd Kentucky Infantry, 7th Kentucky Infantry, and 8th Kentucky Infantry became part of the Army of Tennessee and returned to Port Hudson. The 3rd Kentucky Infantry were en route to Bragg at Tullahoma, Tennessee, when they were ordered to reinforce Lieutenant General John C. Pemberton in the defenses of Vicksburg, Mississippi.

By 1864, the regiment's strength was severely depleted. The 3rd Kentucky Infantry was ordered to report to General Nathan Bedford Forrest. Horses were unavailable, so the men followed Forrest on foot. The Kentucky troops that accompanied Forrest were divided into four brigades. The 3rd Kentucky Infantry was in the third brigade with the 7th Kentucky Infantry, and 8th Kentucky Infantry, commanded by Colonel A. P. Thompson. On March 15, 1864, Forrest moved north toward Paducah, Kentucky. Three miles from Paducah they encountered Union pickets and pushed them back to their camp on the outskirts of town. Under fire from a nearby fort, the Kentuckians moved through the streets of Paducah. The fort was discovered to be impenetrable, and a retreat was ordered. Thompson was killed by cannon fire while leading his troops. Forrest soon returned to Mississippi where the regiment was engaged at the Battle of Brice's Crossroads. At some point in the campaign to Kentucky, the regiment was mounted, becoming the 3rd Kentucky Mounted Infantry.

The regiment participated in the Battle of Franklin and surrendered on May 6, 1865, at Columbus, Mississippi.

== Commanders ==
- Colonel Lloyd Tilghman - promoted to brigadier general
- Colonel Albert P. Thompson

== See also ==
- List of Kentucky Civil War Confederate units
- Kentucky in the Civil War
