= Joseph Horace Lewis =

American politician

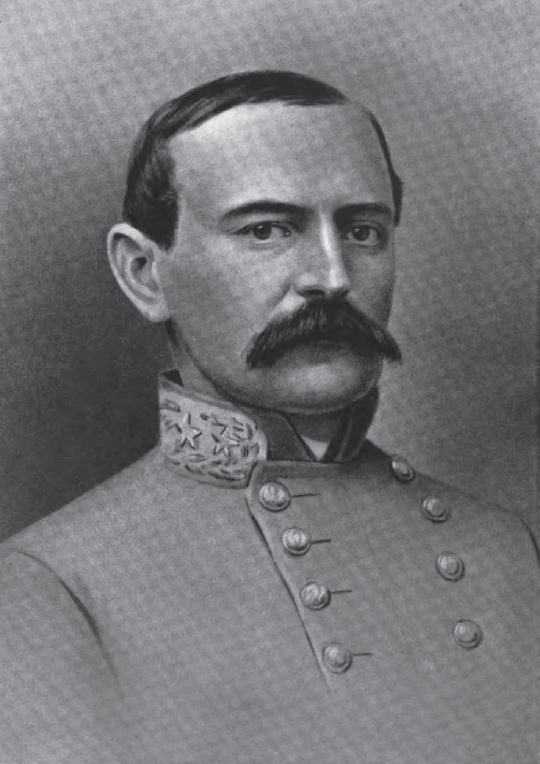

Member of the U.S. House of Representatives from Kentucky's 3rd district
- In office May 10, 1870 – March 3, 1873
- Preceded by: Jacob Golladay
- Succeeded by: Charles W. Milliken

Member of the Kentucky House of Representatives from Barren County
- In office August 2, 1869 – May 1870
- Preceded by: Basil G. Smith
- Succeeded by: Samuel W. Brents
- In office August 5, 1850 – August 6, 1855 Serving with Basil G. Smith (1850–51); James P. Bates (1851–55)
- Preceded by: James P. Bates; William J. Wood Jr.
- Succeeded by: Robinson P. Beauchamp; Thomas H. M. Winn

Personal details
- Born: October 29, 1824 Barren County, Kentucky
- Died: July 6, 1904 (aged 79) Scott County, Kentucky
- Resting place: Glasgow Municipal Cemetery, Glasgow, Kentucky
- Party: Whig; Democrat
- Spouse(s): Sarah Rogers; Cassandra F. Flournoy Johnson
- Education: Centre College
- Profession: Lawyer

Military service
- Allegiance: Confederate States of America
- Branch/service: Confederate States Army
- Years of service: 1861-1865
- Rank: Brigadier general
- Unit: 6th Kentucky Infantry Regiment; Orphan Brigade
- Battles/wars: American Civil War

Joseph Horace Lewis (October 29, 1824 – July 6, 1904) was an American lawyer, military leader and politician. He served as a brigadier general in the Confederate States Army during the American Civil War, and later a U.S. representative from Kentucky and justice of the Kentucky Court of Appeals, the court of last resort in Kentucky at the time.

== Early life and family ==
Joseph H. Lewis was born near Glasgow, Kentucky on October 29, 1824. He was the son of John and Eliza Martz (Reed) Lewis. His father was a volunteer in the War of 1812, serving under Andrew Jackson at the Battle of New Orleans.

Lewis attained his early education in the local public schools. He then matriculated to Centre College in Danville, Kentucky, graduating in 1843. After graduation, he read law under Judge C. C. Thompkins. He was admitted to the bar in 1845 and commenced practice in Glasgow.

Lewis married Sarah Rogers, who died in 1858. The couple had two children – John Lewis and Eliza (Lewis) Burnham.

== Political career ==
Lewis was elected as a Whig to the Kentucky House of Representatives in 1850. He was re-elected twice, serving until 1855. After the collapse of the Whig Party, Lewis became a Democrat. He was an unsuccessful candidate for a seat in the U.S. House of Representatives in 1856 and 1860.

In September 1861, Lewis volunteered for service in the Confederate Army and was commissioned colonel of the 6th Kentucky Infantry. Following the Battle of Chickamauga, he was promoted to brigadier general for meritorious conduct. He was given command of the Orphan Brigade and remained their commander until the end of the war.

After the war, Lewis returned to Glasgow and resumed the practice of law. He was again elected to the Kentucky House in 1868 and chaired that body's Committee on Education. In 1870, he was elected to the U.S. House of Representatives to fill the vacancy caused by the resignation of Jacob S. Golladay. At the next general election, he was elected to a full term. He was not a candidate for renomination in 1872. In all, he served from May 10, 1870, to March 3, 1873.

After retiring from Congress, Lewis briefly returned to the practice of law. He was elected judge of the Kentucky Court of Appeals in 1874. He was re-elected to subsequent terms and served until 1898. In 1883, Lewis married a widow named Cassandra F. Flournoy Johnson.

After leaving the court, Lewis moved to a farm in Scott County, Kentucky near Georgetown, where he died on July 6, 1904. He was interred in Glasgow Cemetery.

== See also ==
- List of American Civil War generals (Confederate)

== Notes ==
U.S. House of Representatives
Preceded by Jacob Golladay	United States Representative, Kentucky's 3rd district 1870–1873	Succeeded by Charles W. Milliken
