= List of Confederate units from Kentucky in the American Civil War =

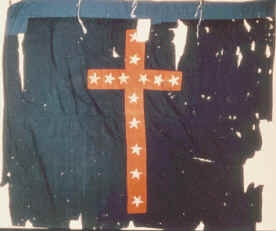
Regimental flag of the 4th Kentucky Infantry.

This is a list of Confederate units from Kentucky in the American Civil War. The list of Kentucky Union Civil War units is shown separately.

== Infantry ==
- 1st Infantry
- 2nd Infantry (later 2nd Mounted Infantry)
- 3rd Infantry (later 3rd Mounted Infantry)
- 4th Infantry (later 4th Mounted Infantry)
- 5th Infantry (later 5th Mounted Infantry)
- 6th Infantry (later 6th Mounted Infantry)
- 7th Infantry (later 7th Mounted Infantry)
- 8th Infantry (later 8th Mounted Infantry
- 9th Infantry (Hunt's 5th Regiment, later 9th Mounted Infantry)
- 1st Battalion, Infantry (Cofer's, see 6th Infantry)
- 1st Battalion, Infantry (Duncan's, see 1st Infantry)
- 1st Battalion, Infantry (Taylor's, see 1st Infantry)
- Desha's Battalion, Infantry
- Freeman's Battalion, Infantry (see 5th Infantry)
- Ficklin's Battalion, Infantry
- Kirkpatrick's Battalion, Infantry
- White's Infantry Battalion, Infantry

== Cavalry ==
- 1st Cavalry, also known as "1st (3rd)" and "3rd (Butler's)"
- 2nd (Morgan's/Duke's) Cavalry
- 2nd (Woodward's) Cavalry
- 3rd Cavalry
- 3rd & 7th Cavalry (consolidated)
- 4th Cavalry
- 5th Cavalry
- 6th Cavalry
- 7th Cavalry
- 8th Cavalry
- 8th & 12th Cavalry (consolidated)
- 9th Cavalry (4th Mounted Rifles)
- 10th Cavalry (May's)
- 11th Cavalry
- 12th Cavalry (1st Kentucky and Tennessee)
- 13th Cavalry (10th Mounted Rifles, 11th Mounted Rifles)
- 14th Cavalry (Richard C. Morgan's)
- 1st Battalion, Cavalry
- 1st Special Battalion, Cavalry
- 2nd Battalion, Cavalry (see 7th Battalion, Cavalry)
- 2nd Consolidated Battalion, Cavalry
- 2nd Special Battalion, Cavalry
- 3rd Battalion, Cavalry - failed to complete organization
- 3rd Special Battalion, Cavalry
- 4th Special Battalion, Cavalry
- Breckinridge's Battalion, Cavalry (see 9th Cavalry)
- Bullitt's Battalion, Cavalry (see 6th Cavalry)
- Stoner's Battalion, Cavalry (see 9th Cavalry)
- Woodward's Battalion, Cavalry (see 2nd Cavalry)

=== Mounted Rifles ===
- Caudill's Army
- 1st Battalion, Mounted Rifles
- 2nd Battalion, Mounted Rifles
- 3rd Battalion, Mounted Rifles
- Jessee's Battalion, Mounted Rifles (see 6th Battalion, Confederate Cavalry)
- King's Battalion, Cavalry (see 1st Confederate Cavalry)
- May's Mounted Battalion (see 10th Cavalry)

=== Partisan Rangers ===
- Morehead's Regiment, Partisan Rangers
- Patton's Partisan Rangers

=== Artillery ===
- 1st Kentucky Artillery (Lyon's/Cobb's Battery)
- Byrne's Artillery Battery
- Cumberland Artillery Battery (Green's/Hedden's Battery)
- Graves' Battery
- Harris'-Arnett's-Corbett's Artillery Battery

== See also ==
- Orphan Brigade
- Lists of American Civil War Regiments by State
- Confederate Units by State
