= Roger Hanson =

American politician

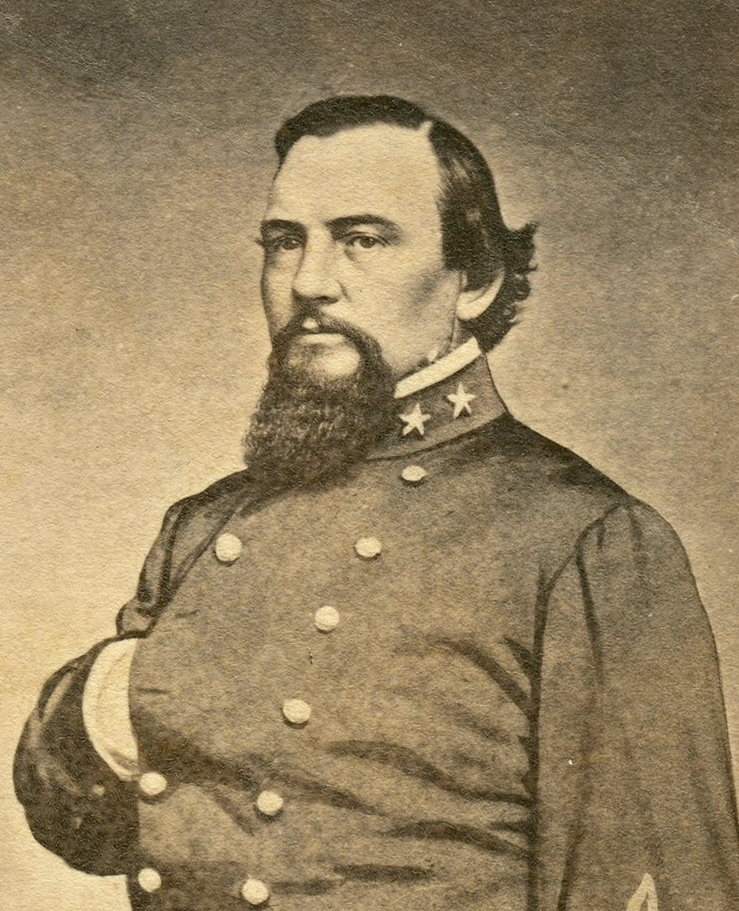
- Gen. Roger W. Hanson
- Born: August 27, 1827
- Died: January 4, 1863 (aged 35)
- Military career
- Allegiance: United States of America; Confederate States of America
- Branch: United States Army; Confederate States Army
- Service years: 1861–1863 (CSA)
- Rank: 1st Lieutenant (USV); Brigadier General (CSA)
- Unit: 4th Kentucky Volunteers
- Commands: 2nd Kentucky Infantry Regiment; Orphan Brigade
- Conflicts: Mexican–American War: Battle of Cerro Gordo; American Civil War: Battle of Fort Donelson; Battle of Stones River †

Member of the Kentucky House of Representatives
- In office August 1, 1853 – August 3, 1857 Serving with Richard J. Spurr (1855-1857)
- Preceded by: John Stuart Williams
- Succeeded by: Leslie Combs; Madison C. Johnson
- Constituency: Clark County (1853-1855); Fayette County (1855-1857)

Roger Weightman Hanson (August 27, 1827 – January 4, 1863) was a brigadier general in the Confederate States Army during the American Civil War. The commander of the famed "Orphan Brigade," he was mortally wounded at the Battle of Stones River. He was nicknamed "Old Flintlock."

== Early life ==
Hanson was born in Clark County, Kentucky. His father, Samuel Hanson, was a Swedish immigrant and well-known attorney and judge who had moved to Kentucky from Virginia. His mother, Matilda Calloway, was the daughter of a general. Hanson's brother, Charles S. Hanson, later fought for the Union Army, serving as Lieutenant Colonel of the 20th Regiment Kentucky Volunteer Infantry in the 22nd Brigade under the command of Major General Thomas L. Crittenden.

At age 18, Hanson was elected as lieutenant in a volunteer company of the 4th Kentucky Regiment during the Mexican–American War. He was cited for bravery at the Battle of Cerro Gordo. He returned home and studied law in Lexington, Kentucky, where he engaged in a duel with a classmate. He was shot in the leg just above the knee, making him lame for the rest of his life. When he recovered, Hanson traveled to California, losing his horse on the way and being forced to walk over 200 miles to San Francisco on his injured leg. He returned to Kentucky within a year. In 1853, he married Virginia Peters of Woodford County, Kentucky.

The following year, Hanson moved to Lexington and established a profitable law practice. Entering politics, Hanson was elected to the Kentucky state legislature as a representative from his home district. He was nominated in 1857 to run for the United States House of Representatives from Kentucky's 8th District, but was defeated by James B. Clay. In 1860, he was one of the electors in the Electoral College from Kentucky.

== Civil War ==
With the outbreak of the Civil War, Kentucky declared itself neutral and stayed in the Union. Hanson was named as colonel of a regiment of Confederate troops he had raised in Lexington, Kentucky but which enlisted in Tennessee because of Kentucky's neutrality. When President Abraham Lincoln sent Federal troops into Lexington and raised the Union flag over the city, Hanson and his Confederate 2nd Kentucky Infantry Regiment were "orphaned", since they could not return home unless Lexington fell to the Confederates. The regiment was taken prisoner with the Confederate surrender of Fort Donelson to Union Brigadier General Ulysses S. Grant. After being exchanged for Michael Corcoran 7 months later, Hanson was presented with a new horse by admiring friends. His regiment reenlisted for the war, and Hanson was promoted to brigadier general in December 1862, commanding his old regiment as well as the 4th, 6th and 9th Kentucky Infantry regiments, plus the 41st Alabama Regiment and Cobb's Battery, in Major General John C. Breckinridge's division, Lieutenant General William J. Hardee's corps.

In his first battle as a general, Hanson was mortally wounded on January 2, 1863, during a charge at Murfreesboro (Stones River) when he was struck above the knee by the fuse of a spent artillery shell. His brother-in-law vainly tried to stop the bleeding. He died two days later at the age of 35, with his last words as "I die in a just cause, having done my duty." General Breckinridge remarked in his official report, "Endeared to his friends by his private virtues and to his command by the vigilance with which he guarded its interest and honor, he was, by the universal testimony of his military associates, one of the finest officers that adorned the service of the Confederate States."

Hanson was buried at Lexington Cemetery in Lexington, Kentucky.

== Legacy ==
The General Roger W. Hanson Camp #1844 (Winchester, Kentucky) of the Sons of Confederate Veterans was named in his memory.

== See also ==
- List of American Civil War generals (Confederate)

== Further read ==
- Richard Owen; James Owen (1997). Generals at Rest: The Grave Sites of the 425 Official Confederate Generals. Shippensburg, PA: White Mane Publishing Co. ISBN 1-57249-045-4.
