= 2nd Kentucky Infantry Regiment (Confederate) =

- Active: August 1861 to April 26, 1865
- Country: Confederate States of America
- Allegiance: CSA
- Branch: Infantry
- Engagements: Battle of Fort Donelson; Battle of Shiloh; Battle of Stones River; Battle of Chickamauga; Atlanta campaign Siege of Savannah; Carolinas campaign

The 2nd Kentucky Infantry Regiment was an infantry regiment that served in the Confederate States Army during the American Civil War. It was part of the First Kentucky Brigade.

== Service ==
The 2nd Kentucky Infantry was organized in August 1861, at Camp Boone in Montgomery County, Tennessee, and became part of the Orphan Brigade. The men were recruited from Hickman, Fayette, Bullitt, Jefferson, Graves, Franklin, Harrison, Scott, Owen, Bourbon, and Anderson counties. In October of that same year, the regiment contained 832 men and, at the Battle of Fort Donelson, its force of 618 was captured. After being exchanged, the reconstituted regiment saw action at the Battle of Shiloh. It later was assigned to Hanson's, Helm's, and J.H. Lewis' Brigade. The 2nd Kentucky Infantry was involved in the battles of Murfreesboro and Chickamauga. It reported 13 killed, 70 wounded, and 21 missing at Murfreesboro, lost fifty-two percent of the 302 engaged at Chickamauga, and totaled 293 men and 214 arms in December 1863.

The following summer, the regiment participated in the Atlanta campaign. During fall 1864, the unit served as mounted infantry and took part in the defense of Savannah and the subsequent Carolinas campaign in early 1865. On April 26, 1865, it surrendered with the Army of Tennessee at Washington, Georgia.

== Commanders ==
- Colonel Roger Weightman Hanson
- Colonel James Morrison Hawes
- Colonel Robert A. Johnston
- Colonel James W. Moss
- Major James W. Hewitt - commanded at the battle of Shiloh; commanded at the battle of Chickamauga as lieutenant colonel
- Captain James W. Moss - commanded at the battle of Shiloh

== See also ==
- List of Kentucky Civil War Confederate units
- Kentucky in the Civil War
