= Battle of Wyse Fork order of battle: Confederate =

The following units and commanders fought in the Battle of Wyse Fork. The Union order of battle is listed separately.

== Abbreviations used ==
=== Military Rank ===
- Gen = General
- LTG = Lieutenant General
- MG = Major General
- BG = Brigadier General
- Col = Colonel
- Ltc = Lieutenant Colonel
- Maj = Major
- Cpt = Captain
- Lt = Lieutenant

=== Other ===
- (w) = wounded
- (mw) = mortally wounded
- (k) = killed in action
- (c) = captured

== Department of North Carolina ==
Gen Braxton Bragg

=== Hoke's Division ===
Division	Brigade	Regiments and Others
Hoke's Division; MG Robert F. Hoke	Clingman's Brigade Col William S. Devane	8th North Carolina; 31st North Carolina; 51st North Carolina; 61st North Carolina
Hoke's Division; MG Robert F. Hoke	Kirkland's Brigade BG William W. Kirkland	17th North Carolina; 42nd North Carolina; 66th North Carolina
Hoke's Division; MG Robert F. Hoke	Hagood's Brigade BG Johnson Hagood	Contingent of Ltc John D. Taylor; 36th North Carolina; 1st North Carolina Heavy Artillery Battalion; 13th North Carolina Light Artillery Battalion; Contingent of Maj William A. Holland; 40th North Carolina
Hoke's Division; MG Robert F. Hoke	Colquitt's Brigade Col Charles Zachry	6th Georgia; 19th Georgia; 23rd Georgia; 27th Georgia; 28th Georgia
Hoke's Division; MG Robert F. Hoke	North Carolina Junior Reserves Brigade BG Laurence S. Baker	1st North Carolina Junior Reserves; 2nd North Carolina Junior Reserves; 3rd North Carolina Junior Reserves; 20th North Carolina Junior Reserves Battalion
Hoke's Division; MG Robert F. Hoke	Whitford's Brigade Col John N. Whitford	67th North Carolina; 68th North Carolina
	Artillery Ltc Joseph B. Starr	13th North Carolina Light Artillery Battalion (companies B and E)

=== Contingent from Army of Tennessee ===
MG Daniel Harvey Hill

Division	Brigade	Regiments and Others
Clayton's Division, Lee's Corps; MG Henry D. Clayton	Stovall's Brigade Col Henry C. Kellogg	40th Georgia; 41st Georgia; 42nd Georgia; 43rd Georgia
Clayton's Division, Lee's Corps; MG Henry D. Clayton	Jackson's Brigade Ltc James C. Gordon	1st Confederate-66th Georgia; 25th Georgia; 29th-30th Georgia; 1st Georgia Sharpshooter Battalion
Clayton's Division, Lee's Corps; MG Henry D. Clayton	Pettus' Brigade BG Edmund M. Pettus	20th Alabama; 30th Alabama
Hill's Division; Col John G. Coltart	Manigault's Brigade Ltc John C. Carter	10th South Carolina; 19th South Carolina
Hill's Division; Col John G. Coltart	Deas' Brigade Col Harry Toulmin	22nd Alabama; 25th Alabama; 39th Alabama; 50th Alabama
Detachment from Stewart's Corps; MG Edward C. Walthall	Scott's Brigade Cpt John A. Dixon	12th Louisiana; 27th-35th-49th Alabama
Detachment from Stewart's Corps; MG Edward C. Walthall	Quarles' Brigade BG George Doherty Johnston	1st Alabama; 17th Alabama; 29th Alabama; 42nd-46th-49th-53rd-55th Tennessee
Detachment from Stewart's Corps; MG Edward C. Walthall	Featherston's Brigade Maj Martin A. Oatis	1st Mississippi; 3rd Mississippi; 22nd Mississippi; 31st Mississippi; 33rd Mississippi; 40th Mississippi; 1st Battalion, Mississippi Sharpshooters
Detachment from Stewart's Corps; MG Edward C. Walthall	Lowry's Brigade Ltc Robert Lawrence	6th Mississippi; 14th Mississippi; 15th Mississippi; 20th Mississippi; 23rd Mississippi; 43rd Mississippi

== Sources ==
- Hughes, Jr. Nathaniel Cheairs. Bentonville: The Final Battle of Sherman and Johnston. University of North Carolina Press, 1996. ISBN 0-8078-2281-7
- Historical Preservation Group website
