= 26th Mississippi Infantry Regiment =

- Active: 1861-1865
- Country: Confederate States of America
- Allegiance: Mississippi
- Branch: Confederate States Army
- Type: Infantry
- Size: Regiment
- Battles: American Civil War: Battle of Fort Donelson; Battle of Coffeeville; Yazoo Pass expedition; Battle of Champion Hill; Meridian Campaign; Battle of the Wilderness; Battle of Spotsylvania Courthouse; Battle of Cold Harbor; Siege of Petersburg

The 26th Mississippi Infantry Regiment was an infantry unit of the Confederate States Army. The Regiment was captured in its entirety following the Battle of Fort Donelson in February 1862, then fought in numerous battles of the Western theater before being sent to Virginia to take part in the Eastern Theater for the final year of the conflict.

== History ==
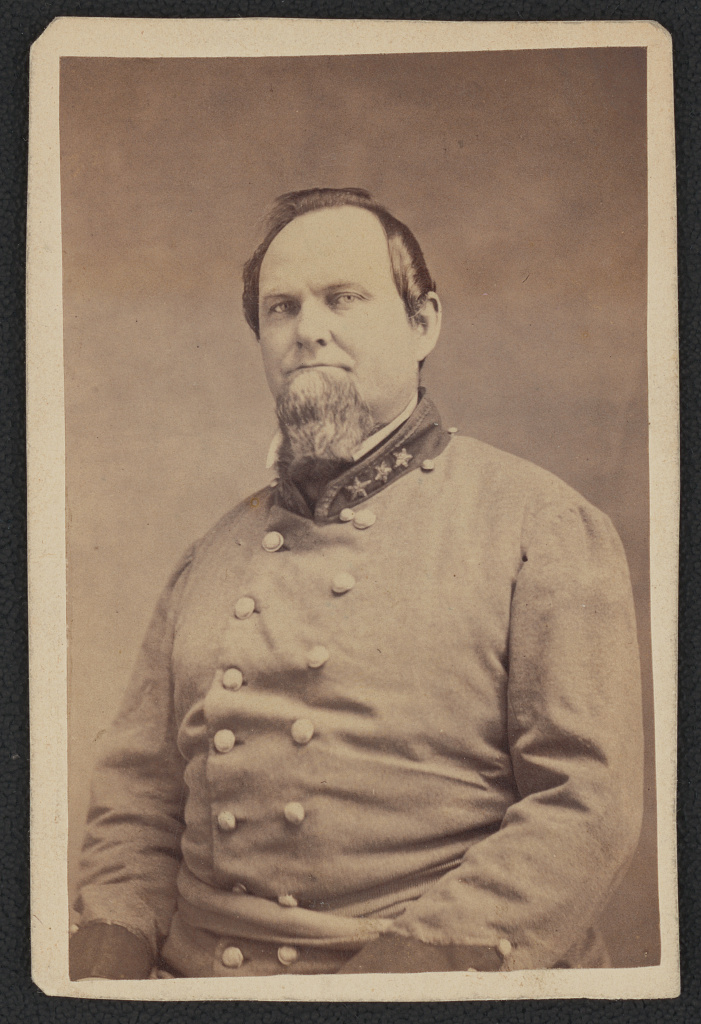
Col. Arthur E. Reynolds, commanding officer of the 26th Mississippi.

The 26th Mississippi was organized from volunteer companies in the summer and fall of 1861, and was sent to Tennessee in December, joining Col. William E. Baldwin's brigade. During the Battle of Fort Donelson in February 1862, Union forces led by General Ulysses S. Grant captured the Confederate defenders of the fort, landing a major blow against Confederate efforts to secure Kentucky and Tennessee. After suffering 11 killed and 78 wounded in the battle, the surviving men and officers of the 26th Mississippi were taken prisoner and sent to POW camps in Ohio and Indiana until the fall of 1862.

The regiment was exchanged and reorganized at Jackson, then sent to North Mississippi where it took part in the Battle of Coffeeville in December 1862.

In January 1863, the 26th was re-assigned from Baldwin's brigade to Brig. Gen. Lloyd Tilghman's brigade, and was at Fort Pemberton during the Yazoo Pass expedition in March and April. It was subsequently sent to the vicinity of Vicksburg to defend the strategic city that was the focus of General Grant's latest advance. Following the Battle of Champion Hill on May 16, the 26th was cut off from other Confederate forces based at Vicksburg, and retreated to the state capital of Jackson. The regiment then fought against General William T. Sherman's Union troops in the Meridian Campaign, before retreating into Alabama following the Confederate defeat in Mississippi.

In April 1864, the 26th was reassigned to General Joseph R. Davis's Mississippi brigade in Army of Northern Virginia. Upon arrival in Virginia, the Regiment fought at the Battle of the Wilderness in May, where the regiment's Lieutenant Colonel Francis M. Boone was killed. The 26th fought in numerous other battles such as Spotsylvania Courthouse and Cold Harbor against Union forces under General Grant, who had also been redeployed to Virginia following his successful campaigns in the West.

The 26th Regiment was moved within the defensive lines of Petersburg, Virginia, one of the Confederacy's last bastions, until the Union forces were able to breakthrough on April 2, 1865. The remnants of the 26th Mississippi were captured at Petersburg and the war came to a close a few weeks later.

== Commanders ==
Commanders of the 26th Mississippi Infantry:

- Col. Arthur E. Reynolds, captured at Fort Donelson, and later returned to service. Wounded near Petersburg, August 1864.
- Lt. Col. Francis M. Boone, killed at the Battle of the Wilderness.

== Organization ==
Companies of the 26th Mississippi Infantry:

- Company A
- Company B, "Boone Avengers".
- Company C, "Bob Davenport Grays" of Tishomingo County.
- Company D
- Company E, "Wince Price Guards"
- Company F, "Anna Perry Guards"
- Company G
- Company H
- Company I

== See also ==
- List of Mississippi Civil War Confederate units
