= 14th Mississippi Infantry Regiment =

- Active: 1861-1865
- Country: Confederate States of America
- Allegiance: Mississippi
- Branch: Confederate States Army
- Type: Infantry
- Size: Regiment
- Battles: American Civil War: Battle of Fort Donelson; Battle of Coffeeville; Battle of Ponchatoula; Battle of Jackson; Atlanta campaign; Battle of Spring Hill; Battle of Franklin; Battle of Nashville; Battle of Kinston (1865); Battle of Bentonville

Commanders
- Notable commanders: William Edwin Baldwin

The 14th Mississippi Infantry Regiment was a unit of the Confederate States Army from Mississippi. After fighting in numerous battles of the Western theater of the American Civil War, the Regiment surrendered in April, 1865, in North Carolina.

== History ==
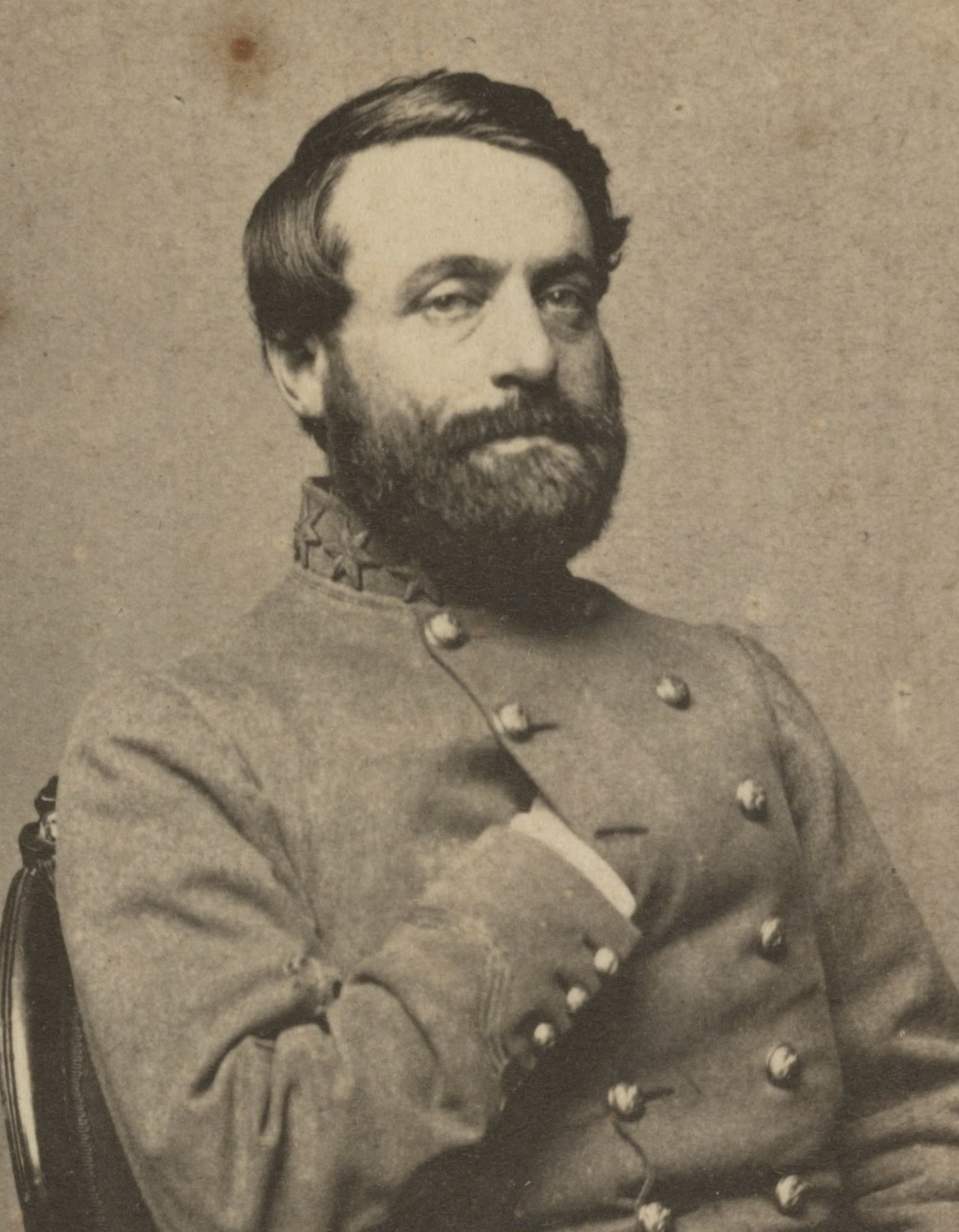
Col. William E. Baldwin of the 14th Mississippi.

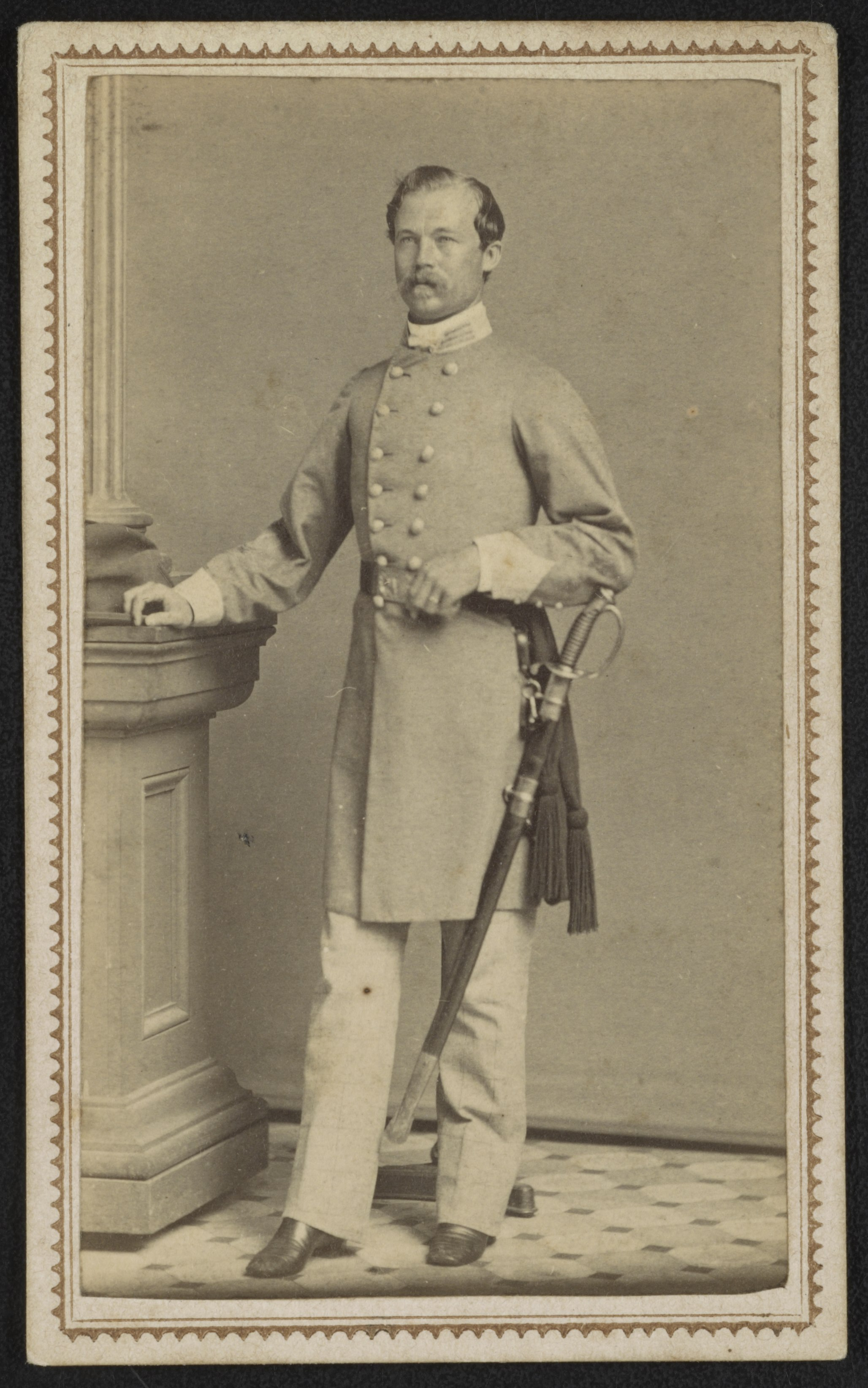
Lieutenant John Summerfield Lanier of the 14th Mississippi.

The volunteer companies that formed the 14th Regiment were assembled at Corinth in May, 1861, initially for state service. Some of the companies had been formed as early as November, 1860, shortly after the Presidential election. The men enlisted for 12-months' service in the Confederate States Army, and officers were elected in early June. The regiment was sent to Tennessee in August, and then onward to Kentucky. Col. William Edwin Baldwin of the 14th was given command of a brigade in September, consisting of his regiment, the 20th and 26th from Mississippi, and the 26th Tennessee. The 14th Mississippi was sent to defend Fort Donelson, and the entire Regiment was taken prisoner after Union general Ulysses S. Grant's troops captured the fort in February, 1862. The regiment was exchanged in October and returned to service shortly thereafter. The 14th Mississippi, in Baldwin's brigade, was assigned to the command of General Lloyd Tilghman and posted in North Mississippi. The regiment fought in the Battle of Coffeeville in December, 1862. In 1863 General Baldwin was reassigned to command of a different brigade, and he died in an accident in 1864 when he was thrown from his horse.

3 companies of the 14th Mississippi took part in the Battle of Ponchatoula in Louisiana in March, 1863. The rest of the Regiment was posted at the state capital under General John Adams, and took part in the Battle of Jackson in May. During the Vicksburg Campaign, the 14th was with General Joseph E. Johnston's forces outside the city, and as such the Regiment was not captured when Vicksburg fell on July 4. Later in July, the 14th fought against Union general William T. Sherman's forces during his Jackson expedition.

Following the collapse of the Confederate forces in Mississippi, the 14th Regiment moved to Georgia and fought in the Atlanta campaign. The regiment fought at Resaca, Kennesaw Mountain, Peachtree Creek and Atlanta before Confederate forces abandoned the city. During the subsequent Franklin-Nashville Campaign, the 14th Mississippi fought at Spring Hill, Franklin, and Nashville before retreating to Mississippi.

In the final year of the war, the 14th was among the forces sent east to take part in General Johnston's Carolinas campaign. The regiment fought at the Battle of Kinston and the Battle of Bentonville. On April 9, the 14th Consolidated Regiment was formed from the remnants of the 14th and the 43rd Regiments, along with several companies of the 6th Mississippi. Col. Robert J. Lawrence was placed in command of this consolidated regiment, which surrendered shortly afterwards on April 26 at Durham, North Carolina.

== Notable members ==
- James M. Arnold, chief justice of the Supreme Court of Mississippi.
- George H. Ethridge, associate justice of the Supreme Court of Mississippi.
- Samuel J. Gholson, Federal judge, later Major general of the Mississippi State Troops and Confederate brigadier general.
- Henry L. Muldrow, US Congressman, First Assistant United States Secretary of the Interior in the Cleveland administration.

== Commanders ==
Commanders of the 14th Mississippi Infantry:

- Col. William Edwin Baldwin, promoted to brigadier general 1862, died in an accident 1864.
- Col. George W. Albert
- Col. Washington L. Doss
- Lt. Col. Marion E. Norris
- Lt. Col. Robert J. Lawrence

== Organization ==
Companies of the 14th Mississippi Infantry:

- Company A, "Shubuta Rifles" of Clarke County.
- Company B, "Enterprise Guards" of Clarke County.
- Company C, "Oktibbeha Rescue"
- Company D, "Quitman Invincibles" of Clarke County.
- Company E, "Monroe Guards"
- Company F, "Beauregard Rifles" of Winston County.
- Company G, "Agency Rifles" of Oktibbeha County.
- Company H, "Meridian Invincibles" of Lauderdale County
- Company I, "Monroe Volunteers"
- Company K, "Columbus Riflemen" of Lowndes County.

== See also ==
- List of Mississippi Civil War Confederate units
