= W. H. L. Wallace =

Union Army general (1821–1862)

William Hervey Lamme Wallace
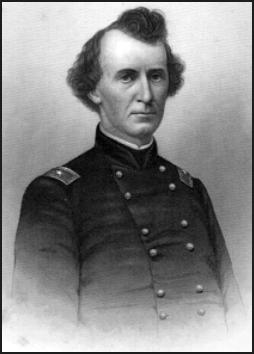
- W. H. L. Wallace
- Born: July 8, 1821; Urbana, Ohio
- Died: April 10, 1862 (aged 40); Savannah, Tennessee
- Burial place: Wallace-Dickey Cemetery, Ottawa, Illinois
- Military career
- Allegiance: United States; Union
- Branch: United States Army; Union Army
- Service years: 1846–1847, 1861–1862
- Rank: Brigadier General
- Conflicts: Mexican–American War: Battle of Buena Vista; American Civil War: Battle of Fort Henry; Battle of Fort Donelson; Battle of Shiloh (DOW)

William Hervey Lamme Wallace (July 8, 1821 – April 10, 1862), more commonly known by his initials as W. H. L. Wallace, was a lawyer and a Union general in the American Civil War, considered by Ulysses S. Grant to be one of the Union's greatest generals.

== Early life ==
Wallace was born in Urbana, Ohio on July 8, 1821, the son of John and Mary Lamme Wallace. In 1840, his family moved to Mount Morris, Illinois for a better education where Rock River Seminary was located.

== Education and career ==
Although he planned to study law with Abraham Lincoln in Springfield, he joined Theophilus Lyle Dickey's practice in Ottawa, Illinois, instead. (Dickey was a friend of Lincoln's and would eventually be a justice of the Illinois Supreme Court.) Wallace became licensed in law in 1846 and that same year he joined the 1st Illinois Infantry as a private. He rose to the rank second lieutenant and adjutant and participated in the Battle of Buena Vista along with a few other minor engagements. After this brief experience in the Mexican–American War, he became district attorney in 1853.

=== Civil War service and death ===
At the start of the Civil War, Wallace volunteered as a private with the 11th Illinois Infantry, which was assembled in Springfield. He was then elected the unit's colonel. He rose up the ranks and commanded a brigade of Brig. Gen. John A. McClernand's division of Grant's Army of the Tennessee at the Battle of Fort Donelson in 1862. During the battle, much of McClernand's division had been driven back with heavy losses and Wallace's coolness under fire was especially noted. Brig. Gen. Lew Wallace described the colonel as looking like a "farmer coming from a hard day's plowing". After this first time meeting upon the Fort Donelson battlefield, the two quickly learned each possessed the same surname and had commanded their respective states' 11th regiments, prompting Lew Wallace to muse the coincidence must have caused "great profanity in the army post office".

For his service at Fort Donelson, Colonel Wallace was appointed a brigadier general of volunteers. During the expedition to Savannah, Tennessee, Maj. Gen. Charles Ferguson Smith injured his leg and was forced to turn over command of his division to Wallace. At the Battle of Shiloh, Wallace was a new division commander, yet he managed to withstand six hours of assaults by the Confederates, directly next to the famous Hornet's Nest, or Sunken Road. When his division was finally surrounded, he ordered a withdrawal and many escaped, but he was wounded and only later found barely alive on the battlefield by his troops. They carried him to his wife, who coincidentally had arrived for a surprise visit to her husband on the very morning of the battle. She helped tend to him on the way back to General Grant's headquarters in the Cherry Mansion in Savannah, Tennessee. He died three days later in his wife's arms; his last words were "We meet in heaven." He is buried in LaSalle County, Illinois, in Ottawa.

He was the brother of future Brevet Brigadier General Martin R. M. Wallace.

== Personal life ==
In 1851, Wallace married Dickey's daughter, Martha Ann.

== Tribute ==
Wallace County, Kansas, was named in his honor in 1868.

== See also ==
- List of American Civil War generals (Union)
