= 9th Mississippi Cavalry Regiment =

19th century Confederate cavalry regiment

- Active: 1863-1865
- Country: Confederate States of America
- Allegiance: Mississippi
- Branch: Confederate States Army; Forrest's Cavalry Corps
- Type: Cavalry
- Size: Regiment
- Battles: American Civil War: Vicksburg Campaign; Meridian Campaign; Atlanta Campaign; Sherman's March to the Sea; Battle of Selma

Commanders
- Notable commanders: Horace H. Miller

The 9th Mississippi Cavalry Regiment was a unit of the Confederate States Army from Mississippi. Organized in 1864 from the merger of two Mississippi and Tennessee cavalry battalions, the 9th Mississippi cavalry fought in many battles of the western theater before surrendering in May 1865.

== Predecessor units ==
The 9th Mississippi Cavalry was formed in February 1864 by the merger of the 17th (Steede's) Mississippi Cavalry Battalion and the 17th (Sanders') Tennessee Battalion Major Abner Steede's battalion was originally a partisan ranger unit raised in 1862 in Hancock County along the Gulf Coast, but the unit quickly developed a reputation for unruly behavior and lax discipline. Steede's unit was reorganized as the 17th Mississippi Battalion in 1863 and was deployed near Jackson during the Vicksburg Campaign. Major Edward J. Sanders' Tennessee battalion had been organized in September, 1862 from two Mississippi and two Tennessee companies, and took part in some small skirmishes in its home state.

== History ==
The new 9th Mississippi Cavalry regiment was led by Colonel Horace H. Miller, formerly of the 20th Mississippi Infantry. The 9th regiment took part in the Meridian campaign in February, opposing Union General William T. Sherman's troops in Mississippi. Later that year the regiment joined the Confederate forces in Georgia during the Atlanta Campaign, as part of Samuel W. Ferguson's brigade, William Hicks Jackson's cavalry division. Following the Confederate defeat in Atlanta, the 9th Mississippi continued fighting in Georgia during Sherman's March to the Sea.

In 1865, the 9th regiment returned to Mississippi and was assigned to service in Forrest's Cavalry Corps. During the final months of the war, many men from the regiment were captured at the Battle of Selma, and only a few were left present at the time of Forrest's surrender in May.

== Commanders ==
Commanders of the 9th Mississippi Cavalry:

- Col. Horace H. Miller
- Lt. Col. E.J. Sanders

== See also ==
- List of Mississippi Civil War Confederate units
