= Pointe Coupee Artillery =

- First National Pattern flag of the Pointe Coupee Artillery completed on May 30, 1861.
- Active: June 20, 1861 – May 4, 1865
- Country: Confederate States of America
- Allegiance: Confederate States Army
- Branch: Field Artillery
- Type: Battalion
- Nicknames: Stewart's Pointe Coupee Artillery Battalion; Pointe Coupee Battery; Bouanchaud's Battery
- Engagements: American Civil War: Belmont; New Madrid; Island #10; Fort Pillow Bombardment; Second Corinth; Hatchie Bridge; Coffeeville; Yazoo Pass Exped.; Fort Pemberton; Deer Creek; Port Hudson Bombardment (March '63); Grierson's Raid; Snyder's Bluff; Vicksburg Campaign; Champion Hill; Big Black River Bridge; Vicksburg Siege; Jackson Siege; Meridian Campaign; Atlanta campaign; Bald Knob - checking/slowing action; Resaca; Adairsville - checking/slowing action; Calhoun - checking/slowing action; Cassville - skirmish; New Hope Church; Marietta; Kennesaw Mountain; Smyrna Camp Ground; Chattahoochee River - Howell's Ferry; Peachtree Creek - Moore's Mill; Atlanta Siege; Chattahoochee River Bridge; Lovejoy's Station; Allatoona Pass; Duck River-skirmish; Franklin - late arrival; Nashville 15th & 16th; Selma; West Point, Georgia, Fort Tyler; Girard, Ala./Columbus, Ga.; "and other skirmishes"

Commanders
- Notable commanders: Major Richard A. Stewart; Capt. Alcide Bouanchaud; Sr. 1st Lt. Charles L. Ilsley; Sr. 1st Lt. E. C. Legendre

The Pointe Coupee Artillery was a Confederate Louisiana artillery unit in the American Civil War made up primarily of men from the parishes of Pointe Coupee, East Baton Rouge, Livingston and other surrounding parishes as well as a large number of men from New Orleans.

== History ==
Popular and influential Mexican war veteran and Rev. Richard A. Stewart of Pointe Coupee Parish began recruiting men in the spring of 1861 eventually forming what would soon become Co A of the Pointe Coupee Artillery. These men received more than adequate training in Baton Rouge by experienced officers of the pre war Donaldsonville Canonniers (Louisiana) of Ascension Parish one of whom transferred to Capt. Stewart's Pointe Coupee Artillery. He assured, they were the first Confederate light artillery to reach the Mississippi River stronghold at Columbus, Ky. as they began their four years of service in the Western Theater of the American Civil War. They went off to war fully equipped with six smoothbore cannon and picked up in Memphis, Tennessee an additional six Confederate manufactured 6 pounder Parrott rifles. Stewart assured his men were equipped with the finest cannon, caissons, limbers, horses, and ordnance available as they were transported from Baton Rouge to the scene of conflict with plenty of trained men to operate them. In October 1861, many men from New Orleans, then serving in the Watson Battery of New Orleans, transferred to the Pointe Coupee Artillery at Columbus, Kentucky. They formed the nucleus of what would soon become Co. B. The battery distinguished itself during the Battle of Belmont and other determined engagements defending that important Miss. River stronghold. Afterward, the men were active in defense of Island Number Ten. Stewart accompanied Co. A when ordered to Fort Pillow. There they assisted in the strengthening of the fort and later endured the terrific and lengthy naval bombardment. The Confederate surrender of Island No. 10 in April, 1862 left most of Co. B prisoners of war for several months. The Confederates promoted Stewart to major in June 1862 and Sr. 1st Lt. Alcide Bouanchaud became captain at that time. Major R. A. Stewart was also authorized by Lt. Gen. Leonidas Polk authorized Major Stewart to form Stewart's Louisiana Legion. Stewart recruited several infantry companies and a squadron of cavalry in Louisiana to accompany his battery. Stewart presented himself as a colonel when he tendered his resignation from Confederate service disgruntled that his many recruits for his legion had been diverted to other commands. Stewart's continued recruiting efforts assured the formation of a third company in August 1862, creating a full artillery battalion of three companies. In mid 1862, the Pointe Coupee Artillery Battalion consisted of Sr. Capt. Alcide Bouanchaud of Co. A, Capt. William A. Davidson of Co. B and Capt. Alex Chust of Co. C. Early Sept. 1862 saw Co. B paroled as prisoners of war. All three companies were present with at least some engaged at the Second Battle of Corinth in early October 1862. A section of Co. A and a section of Co. B, with Capt. Bouanchaud in command, contributed considerably to the successful Confederate ambush of pursuing Union troops at the early December 1862 Battle of Coffeeville in north Mississippi.

All three companies afterward became part of the Department of Mississippi and East Louisiana and participated heavily in the defense of Vicksburg during the first half of 1863. Companies A and C participated in the Union naval bombardment of the Port Hudson, Louisiana Confederate Mississippi River stronghold in March 1863 being placed at Troth's Landing and thus distinguished as the first artillery to fire upon the approaching Union flotilla. In mid April 1863 Companies A and C and their command were ordered to Tullahoma, Tennessee to reinforce General James Longstreet and his army operating around Knoxville, Tennessee but this order was countermanded some days later when a few of the gunboats and troop transport boats of the Union riverine squadron passed by the formidable Confederate Mississippi River batteries at and near Vicksburg, Mississippi on April 16, 1863. Then in Jackson, Miss., a section of Capt. Bouanchaud's Co. A and two Mississippi infantry regiments under the command of Brig. Gen. John Adams were ordered to chase down a Union cavalry raid that eventually ran lengthwise through the center of Mississippi. They unloaded at Lake Station on Mississippi's Southern Railroad but Gen. Grierson had already passed through. During this time Co. B assisted in the defense of the northern approaches to Vicksburg, being assigned one of few imported British Whitworth breech-loading cannon in service in the Confederate West. A detachment of Co. B operated this exceptionally accurate weapon at Fort Pemberton, Snyder's Bluff and on occasion at Vicksburg. Co. B suffered heavy casualties at Fort Pemberton. At Snyder's Bluff Union Gen. W. T. Sherman warned one of his naval commanders to look out for the Whitworth bolts the Confederates were firing referring to the spirally-grooved hexagonal shaped rounds of which were exclusively Co. B of the Pointe Coupee Artillery. Companies A and C were heavily engaged at Champion Hill during the rear guard cover of the retreating Confederate army. Both companies suffered casualties with at least one officer of Co. A and of Co. C killed during the battle. Capt. Chust's section of Co. C and Lt. Yoist's section of Co. A successfully crossed Baker's Creek and were engaged at the Battle of Big Black River Bridge on May 17, 1863. Capt. Bouanchaud and 1st Lt. Charles L. Ilsley commanding the first section of Co. A were cut off at Baker's Creek with about 5,000 of Gen. William W. Loring's troops and retreated to Jackson, Mississippi via Crystal Springs, Mississippi. Co. B suffered heavy casualties during the battles and siege of Vicksburg in the Great Redoubt just south of the Jackson Rd. Also, during the siege of Vicksburg in the summer of 1863 Capt. Bouanchaud enlisted an additional 45 men while operating around Jackson, Miss. in Loring's Division under the overall command of Gen. Joe Johnston. Bouanchaud's part of Co. A now reinforced participated in repulsing the assaults upon and the subsequent bombardment during the siege of Jackson, Mississippi after the fall of Vicksburg in July 1863.

Most of the Vicksburg surrendered parolees of Companies A, B and C returned to their homes in Louisiana and failed to report to any of the exchange and parole camps established by the Confederate War Department for that purpose. Many of them transferred, with Confederate authority, to West’s 6th Battery Volunteer Artillery, a/k/a Grosse Tete Flying Artillery (CSA, Louisiana) commanded by Captain/Major John A. A. West and soon afterward Lt.\Capt. John Yoist former Lieut. of Co. A, Pointe Coupee Artillery. Others transferred or simply joined up with local cavalry commands and some simply deserted the Confederate army. This loss of unit members resulted in the consolidation of the three companies into one company known as Bouanchaud's Battery commanded by Capt. Alcide Bouanchaud. At the reorganization of Confederate artillery they became part of Myrick's Artillery Battalion which mustered 308 officers and men, 209 horses, and twelve - 12 pounder Confederate manufactured Napoleon guns. Bouanchaud's Battery made up one third of that battalion and consisted of 106 officers and men, four 12 pounder Napoleons, wagons and other support vehicles pulled by 82 horses and 25 mules. By early 1864 Bouanchaud's Battery consisted of war seasoned artillerymen. A large majority of the men were from Pointe Coupee and Orleans parishes. They were engaged regularly confronting Gen. W. T. Sherman during his Meridian Campaign of February 1864. The Pointe Coupee Artillery a/k/a Bouanchaud's Battery accompanied the Army of Mississippi commanded by Lt. Gen. Leonidas Polk to Georgia to join the Confederate Army of Tennessee commanded by Gen. Joe Johnston reaching Resaca, Georgia in May 1864 where a section of Bouanchaud's Battery and an infantry brigade were soon after thrown forward to Bald Knob joining Gen. Joseph Wheeler's cavalry for the purpose of stalling the advance of Union Gen. Sherman's army. These forward units successfully delayed the Union approach as Gen. Joe Johnston consolidated his troops and fortified at Resaca prior to the battle. Bouanchaud's Battery was heavily engaged in the fighting for Atlanta in north Georgia performing well in many engagements.

Bouanchaud's cannoneers as part of Myrick's Artillery Battalion accompanied the Army of Tennessee commanded by Lieut. Gen. John B. Hood in its invasion of Tennessee. During the first day of battle at Nashville in Dec. 1864 the Confederate left collapsed and several infantry regiments and Bouanchaud's Battery with Capt. Bouanchaud commanding were selected to halt the advance of the Union army. The infantry was order to hold at all costs. As these Confederate infantry regiments were overrun Capt. Bouanchaud ordered his men to "Fire retiring, by half battery" "Right half battery - retire" and commanded this battle experienced maneuver while firing canister at the now cautiously pursuing enemy. Bouanchaud's Battery was overrun during the battle of the next day. Many of the men became casualties during the two days of battle at Nashville. Bouanchaud's Battery fought under Gen. Nathan Bedford Forrest's heavily outnumbered forces at the Battle of Selma. The battery was located in the outer defenses facing the main approach into Selma and was overrun during the battle. Many of the men became casualties at Selma. Most of the men of Bouanchaud's Battery who escaped capture at Selma retreated to Montgomery, Alabama and moved on to the defenses of Columbus, Georgia but fourteen of them, a detachment, volunteered to proceed to West Point, Georgia and they commanded a cannon at Fort Tyler in the Battle of West Point on April 16, 1865. Lt. Gen. Richard Taylor surrendered his Department of Alabama, Mississippi and East Louisiana to Union forces at Citronelle, Mobile County, Alabama on May 4, 1865. Lt. Justin Plantevignes was the commanding officer of Bouanchaud's Battery when they were surrendered. More than 60 men of Bouanchaud's Battery were paroled at Meridian, Mississippi a few days later and allowed to return to their homes. Of the approximately 553 men that served at one time or another during the war in the Pointe Coupee Artillery a/k/a the Artillery Battalion of Stewart's Legion and later Bouanchaud's Battery at least 80 of them died while in service of the Pointe Coupee Artillery.

== Companies ==
Name	Company	Parish of Origin	Commander
Stewart's Pointe Coupee Artillery Battalion	A,B,C	Pointe Coupee, Orleans, Livingston, Baton Rouge, others	Capt./Major/Col. Richard Atlantic Stewart
Pointe Coupee Artillery	A	Pointe Coupee, others	Capt. Alcide Bouanchaud, Sr. 1st Lt. Charles L. Ilsley, 1st. Lt. John Yoist, 2nd Lt. Edward H. Lombard
Pointe Coupee Artillery	B	Orleans, Livingston, others	Capt./Pvt. Wm. A. Davidson, Sr. 1st Lt. Ernest C. Legendre, Sr. 1st Lt. Jeff Thompson, Jr. 1st Lt. O. Merle d’Aubigne (KIA), 1st Lt. John Q. Wall
Pointe Coupee Artillery	C	Pointe Coupee Parish	Acting Capt. Pierre A. Roy, Jr., Capt. Alex Chust, 1st Lt. Justin Plantevignes, 2nd Lt. Alexandre A. LeDoux (KIA)
Bouanchaud's Battery	-	A,B,C Consolidated	Capt. Alcide Bouanchaud, Sr. 1st Lt. C. L. Ilsley (MWIA), Sr. 1st Lt. E. C. Legendre, Sr. 1st Lt. J. Plantevignes, 2nd Lt. E. H. Lombard

== See also ==
- Louisiana Civil War Confederate Units
- Lists of American Civil War Regiments by State
