= 23rd Mississippi Infantry Regiment =

- Active: 1861–1865
- Disbanded: April 18, 1865
- Country: Confederate States
- Allegiance: Mississippi
- Branch: Confederate States Army
- Type: Infantry
- Size: Regiment
- Battles: American Civil War: Battle of Fort Donelson; Battle of Coffeeville; Vicksburg Campaign; Franklin–Nashville campaign; Carolinas campaign

The 23rd Mississippi Infantry Regiment was a unit of the Confederate States Army from Mississippi during the American Civil War. After being captured in its entirety following the Battle of Fort Donelson, the 23rd Mississippi was reorganized and fought in several campaigns of the Western Theater before surrendering in April 1865.

== History ==
The 23rd Mississippi was organized from North Mississippi volunteer companies assembled at Iuka. Originally the regiment was assigned to state service and formed part of General James L. Alcorn's brigade in the Army of Mississippi sent north to Kentucky in the fall of 1861, denoted as the 3rd Mississippi Regiment. The regiment was transferred to Confederate service in late October, and the name of the regiment was changed to the 23rd Mississippi on November 19. After taking some losses due to disease in Kentucky, the 23rd fought at the Battle of Fort Donelson in February 1862. Most of the regiment was captured when the Confederates surrendered, and the survivors were sent to POW camps in northern states.

After the men of the 23rd were exchanged and released, the regiment was reorganized and re-enlisted for the duration of the war, with new officers elected. In the intervening period, Union troops had made advances into Tennessee and North Mississippi, seeking to control the state's railroads and strategic points. The regiment was deployed in North Mississippi under the command of General Lloyd Tilghman, fighting at the Battle of Coffeeville in December 1862. The 23rd then took part in the defense of Vicksburg, retreat to Jackson and the Meridian Campaign as Union forces gradually took control of the rest of the state.

Following Confederate losses in their home state, the 23rd was sent to Georgia to take part in the defense of Atlanta and the subsequent Franklin–Nashville campaign in Tennessee.

The diminished regiment took part in the Carolinas campaign in the spring of 1865. In April the 23rd was consolidated with the remnants of the 6th, 15th, and 20th Mississippi regiments, and the remaining Confederate forces in North Carolina surrendered on April 18 at Durham.

== In fiction ==
In William Faulkner's novel Absalom, Absalom!, the character Thomas Sutpen was Colonel of the 23rd Mississippi, but Faulkner inaccurately depicts this unit as part of the Army of Northern Virginia rather than serving in the Western theater.

== Commanders ==
Commanders of the 23rd Mississippi Infantry:

- Col. Thomas J. Davidson, died in POW camp, Fort Warren, Massachusetts, 1862.
- Col. Joseph M. Wells
- Lt. Col. Moses McCarley

== Organization ==
Companies of the 23rd Mississippi Infantry:

- Company A, "Blount Guards"
- Company B, "W.C. Falkner Guards" of Tippah County.
- Company C, "Tippah Tigers" of Tippah County.
- Company D, "Kossuth Volunteers" of Tishomingo County.
- Company E, "J.W. Thompson Invincibles" of Tippah County.
- Company F, "Blackland Gideonites" of Tishomingo County.
- Company G, "Tippah Rifle Company" of Tippah County.
- Company H, "Molino Rifles" of Tippah County.
- Company I, "Plentitude Invincibles" of Pontotoc County.
- Company K, "Alcorn Rebels" of Coahoma County.

== See also ==
- List of Mississippi Civil War Confederate units
