= Battle of Coffeeville =

Battle of the American Civil War

Coordinates: 34.003746°N 89.648218°W

- Part of the American Civil War
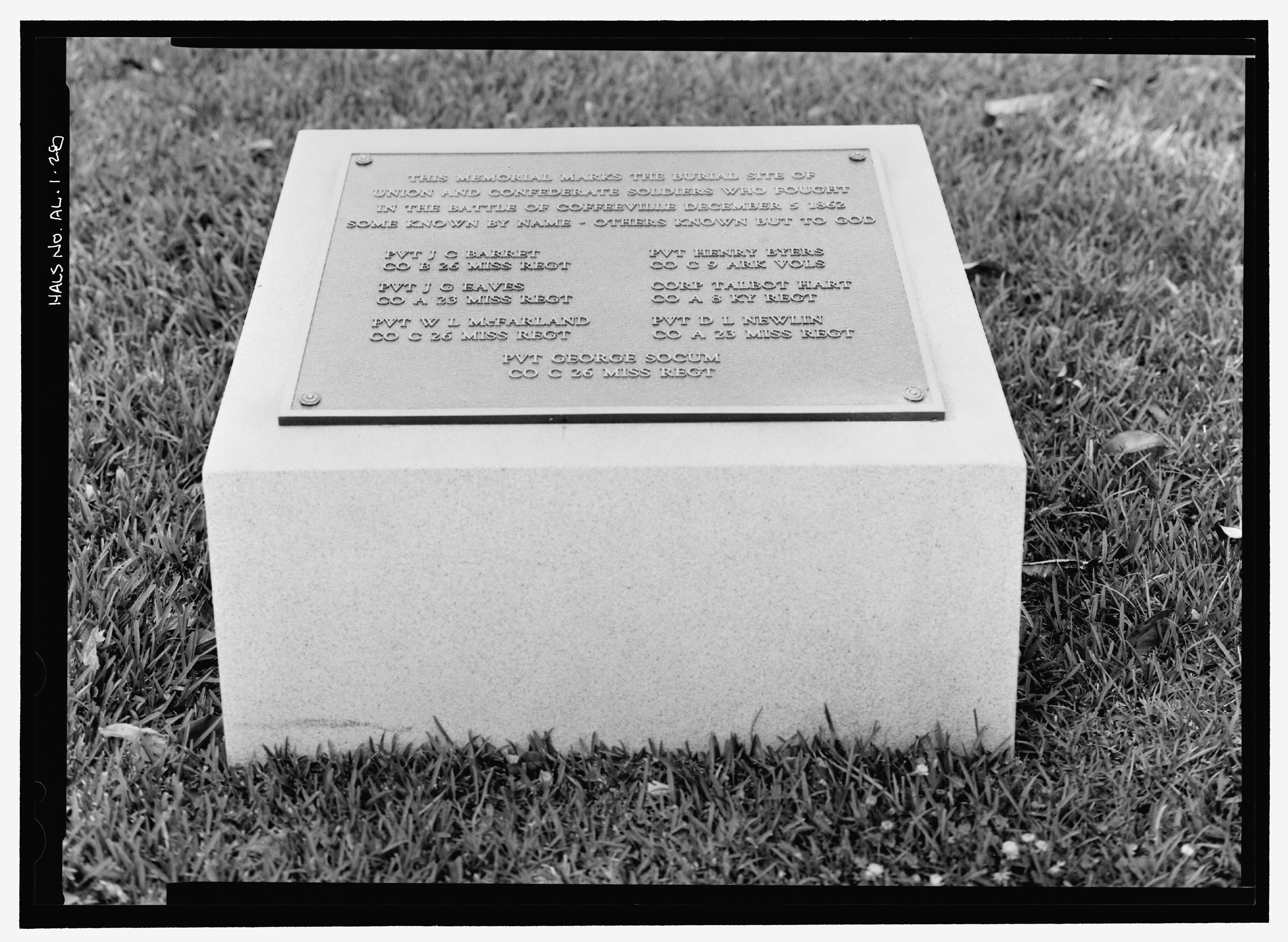
- Battle of Coffeeville Monument, Mobile National Cemetery, Mobile, Alabama
Date	December 5, 1862
Location	Near Coffeeville, Yalobusha County, Mississippi.
Result	Confederate victory

Belligerents
United States	Confederate States

Commanders and leaders
(United States) T. Lyle Dickey	(Confederate States of America) Mansfield Lovell (Confederate States of America) Lloyd Tilghman

Units involved
Cavalry, Army of the Tennessee	1st Corps, Army of West Tennessee

Strength
1,500-3,500; 2 artillery pieces	1,300-2,500; 6 artillery pieces

Casualties and losses
10-34 killed 54-234 wounded 43 captured	7 killed 43 wounded 10 missing

The Battle of Coffeeville, fought December 5, 1862, was a military engagement of the American Civil War fought near Coffeeville, Mississippi.

== Background ==
Operations against Vicksburg and Grant's Bayou Operations. Confederate Union

By November 1862, Northern Mississippi was securely in the hands of the Union army after key, yet costly, wins at Shiloh, Iuka, and Corinth. General Ulysses S. Grant began the Mississippi Central Railroad Campaign, an overland push (following the main rail line through the heart of Mississippi, capturing the towns and rail along the way) into Mississippi with the goal of capturing Vicksburg in conjunction with General William Tecumseh Sherman, who would follow the river route South.

After being defeated at the Battle of Corinth, Major General Earl Van Dorn's Confederate Army of West Tennessee was on the retreat. At the battle of Hatchie's Bridge, Van Dorn successfully evaded the army's capture by the Union. The Confederate army kept falling back through Oxford and then Coffeeville, constantly skirmishing with pursuing Union cavalry, who were ahead of Grant's column.

== Order of battle ==
=== Abbreviations used ===
- MG = Major General
- BG = Brigadier General
- Col = Colonel
- Ltc = Lieutenant Colonel
- Maj = Major
- Cpt = Captain

=== Union ===
Cavalry, Army of the Tennessee – Col Theophilus Lyle Dickey

Brigade	Regiments and Others
Cavalry	4th Illinois Cavalry: Col Theophilus Lyle Dickey; 6th Illinois Cavalry: Col Benjamin Grierson; 2nd Iowa Cavalry: Col Edward Hatch; 7th Kansas Cavalry: BG Albert Lindley Lee; 3rd Michigan Cavalry: Col John Kemp Mizner; 5th Ohio Cavalry: Maj Elbridge G. Ricker
Artillery	Battery G, 2nd Illinois Light Artillery

=== Confederate ===
1st Corps, Army of West Tennessee – MG Mansfield Lovell

Division	Brigade	Regiments and Others
1st Division; BG Lloyd Tilghman	1st Brigade BG William Edwin Baldwin	8th Kentucky Infantry: Col Hylan B. Lyon; 14th Mississippi Infantry: Maj Washington L. Doss; 23rd Mississippi Infantry: Ltc Moses McCarley; 26th Mississippi Infantry: Maj Tully F. Parker
1st Division; BG Lloyd Tilghman	Cavalry Col William Hicks Jackson	7th Tennessee Cavalry
1st Division; BG Lloyd Tilghman	Artillery Cpt Culbertson	Cumberland Light Artillery, Kentucky (one section): Cpt W. H. Hedden
2nd Division; BG Albert Rust	2nd Brigade Col Albert P. Thompson	9th Arkansas Infantry: Col Isaac L. Dunlop; 3rd Kentucky Infantry
Unattached	Infantry	20th Arkansas Infantry
Unattached	Artillery	A section of Co. A and a section of Co. B, Pointe Coupee Artillery: Cpt Alcide Bouanchaud

== The Battle ==
Outside of Coffeeville, the Confederate command decided to ambush the harassing enemy cavalry. On December 5, under the command of Brigadier General Lloyd Tilghman, the men of Baldwin, Tilghman and Rust's brigades with artillery and support from W. H. Jackson's units, hid on a wooded ridge alongside the Water Valley-Coffeeville Road.

Around 2:30 pm, the Union Cavalry (led by Colonel Theophilus Lyle Dickey) approached Coffeeville within one mile. When the Cavalry was within 50 yards of the Confederate positions, it was fired upon by artillery, followed by volleys of infantry fire.

According to letters sent from James Thompson, a member of the Union cavalry, to his wife, Charlotte, James was positioned behind Colonel Dickey in the column. He states that during the charge, Colonel Dickey was shot three times and that one of the orderlies was shot four times. Thompson fell off of his horse and was held prisoner before attempting to escape on another horse, which the Confederates shot. He promptly found a third horse and made his escape "without a scratch."

After the skirmish, the Confederates pushed the Union Cavalry back about three miles to the head of Grant's column. The pursuit halted and the Confederates returned to the ambush site. The Union Cavalry retreated to Water Valley. The fighting lasted from around 4 pm until dark. The Battle of Coffeeville brought Grant's Mississippi invasion via Tennessee to a halt. He pulled his army back to Oxford.

== Aftermath ==
The Confederate victory at Coffeeville halted the Union pursuit and allowed the retreating Confederate force to continue south toward Grenada. The action formed part of the wider Mississippi Central Railroad Campaign, in which Grant sought to advance along the railroad toward Vicksburg. The engagement also demonstrated the value of using artillery and concealed infantry positions to slow an advancing cavalry column.
