= Martin R. M. Wallace =

Union military officer during American civil war (1829 - 1902)

Martin Reuben Merritt Wallace
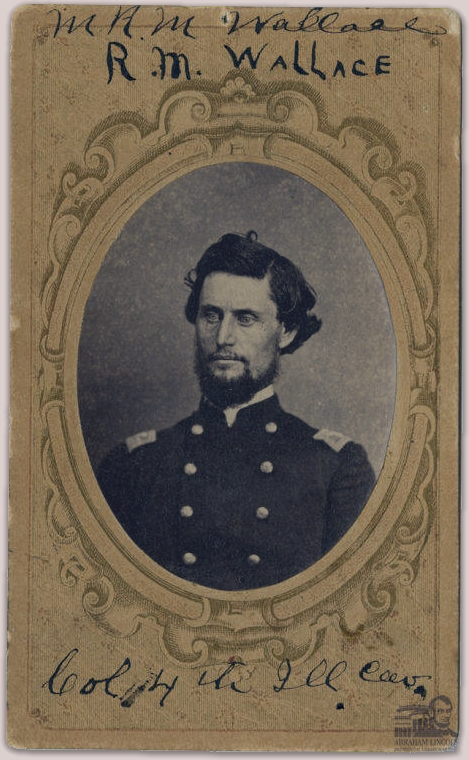
- Born: September 29, 1829; Urbana, Ohio
- Died: March 6, 1902 (aged 72); Chicago, Illinois
- Burial place: Rosehill Cemetery; Chicago, Illinois
- Spouse: Emma Gilson Wallace
- Military career
- Allegiance: United States of America; Union
- Branch: Union Army
- Service years: 1861–1864
- Rank: Colonel brevet Brigadier General
- Unit: 4th Regiment Illinois Volunteer Cavalry
- Conflicts: American Civil War: Battle of Fort Henry; Battle of Fort Donelson; Battle of Shiloh

Martin Reuben Merritt Wallace (September 29, 1829 – March 6, 1902) was a Union Army officer from October 12, 1861, to November 3, 1864, during the American Civil War. He was colonel of the 4th Regiment Illinois Volunteer Cavalry when he was mustered out of the volunteers on November 3, 1864. In recognition of his service, in May 1866, he was nominated for appointment and confirmed to the grade of brevet brigadier general of volunteers, to rank from March 13, 1865.

== Biography ==
Martin R. M. Wallace was born in Urbana, Ohio, on September 29, 1829. He was the eighth child (fourth son) born to John Wallace; his brother W. H. L. would go on to become a general. In 1834, the Wallaces moved to LaSalle County, Illinois. Wallace attended public school in the winter and worked on the farm the rest of the year. In 1839, the family moved to Ogle County, Illinois, near Mount Morris, where Wallace's father was a trustee of the Rock River Seminary. Wallace attended that institution and, after graduating, decided to pursue law as a profession. He studied with elder brother W. H. L. Wallace at Dickey & Wallace in Ottawa, Illinois. Wallace was admitted to the bar in 1858 and moved to Chicago, Illinois, to form a practice with Thomas Dent.

Upon the outbreak of the Civil War, Wallace helped to organize the 4th Regiment Illinois Volunteer Cavalry. He received a commission of major for the regiment on October 12, 1861. He served under former law associate Colonel Theophilus Lyle Dickey. He led a battalion at the battles of Fort Henry, Fort Donelson, and Shiloh. At the latter engagement, Wallace's brother W. H. L. Wallace was killed. Martin R. M. Wallace assumed control of the 4th Illinois Cavalry Regiment following the death of Colonel William McCullough in December 1862. Wallace was promoted to lieutenant colonel on January 5, 1863, and to a full colonel on June 3, 1863. Wallace was mustered out of the volunteers on November 3, 1864.

On May 4, 1866, President Andrew Johnson nominated Wallace for appointment to the grade of brevet brigadier general of volunteers (an honorary commission in recognition of his service in view of the fact he was no longer an army officer), to rank from March 13, 1865, and the United States Senate confirmed the appointment on May 16, 1866.

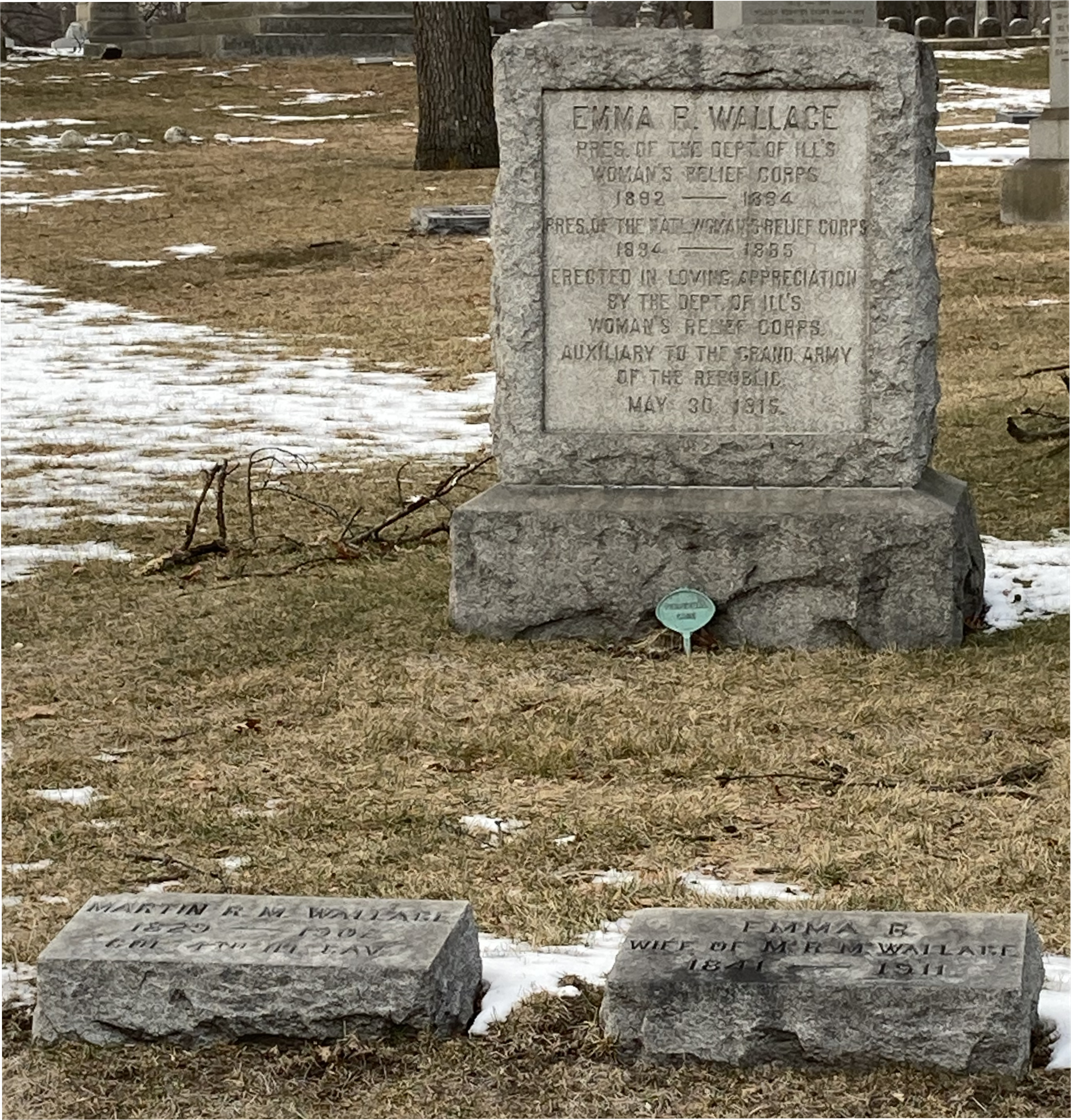
Wallace's grave at Rosehill Cemetery

After the war, Wallace was named United States Assessor for the Chicago District. In 1868, he was elected to the Cook County Court, serving for eight years. In 1889 he was appointed by Gov. Joseph Fifer to serve as Justice of the Peace for South Chicago. He also served as an attorney on the Cook County board.

Wallace's wife Emma achieved some note as a philanthropist.

Martin R. M. Wallace died on March 6, 1902, at Chicago, Illinois, and was interred in Rosehill Cemetery.

== See also ==
- List of American Civil War brevet generals (Union)
