= Horace H. Miller =

American lawyer and diplomat (1826–1877)

Horace H. Miller (March 15, 1826 – January 26, 1877) was an American and Confederate military officer, newspaperman, lawyer, and diplomat. He worked for most of his career in Vicksburg, Mississippi. He served as the United States ambassador to Bolivia from 1852 to 1856.

== Biography ==
Miller was a native of Louisville, Kentucky. He was the son of Anderson Miller, whose family was originally from Virginia and who had been a pioneer of both steamboating the Mississippi and producing cotton-seed oil. Miller invested in a commercial-scale cotton-seed press built at Natchez in 1834. The elder Miller, who was variously described as a "celebrated steamboat captain" and/or "land speculator and gentleman of pleasure," was appointed U.S. marshal for the Southern District of Mississippi in 1841, serving until 1845. The appointment was made by John Tyler following the death of William Henry Harrison, for whom Miller had been a Whig nominating convention delegate.

His brother William Trigg Miller worked for their father as a deputy marshal and married Emily Van Dorn, a grandniece of Andrew Jackson and sister of future Confederate General Earl Van Dorn.

At age 21, Miller fought in the Mexican–American War, serving as a sergeant major in the Vicksburg Volunteers, Captain George Crump's company, later called Company H, in the Mississippi Rifles. He and partner Charles Buck founded the True Issue newspaper at Vicksburg in 1851. The True Issue was probably a Whig paper because that was where Alexander K. McClung pushed his editorials. Miller was by profession primarily an attorney. He succeeded Alexander Keith McClung, fellow Mississippian and a Marshall political family scion, as charge d'Affaires to Bolivia, appointed to the post in 1852 by president Millard Fillmore. Miller was after this law partners with his brother-in-law Thomas A. Marshall, who had married to his Miller's older sister Letitia, and who, like McClung, was a cousin of Chief Justice John Marshall. Miller was married around 1857 to Sarah Augusta Ragan of Warren County, Mississippi.

He was also an officer on the Confederate side of the American Civil War. In March 1861 he was a brigadier general of the Mississippi state militia charged with "fortifying Vicksburg." He went to Virginia with the 12th Mississippi in May 1861. He was captured at Fort Donelson. In 1863 as lieutenant colonel of the 20th Mississippi Infantry he commanded an expedition from Hammond Station and thus was one of the defenders of a Confederate position from within an abandoned shoe factory at Ponchatoula, Louisiana. In 1864 he became colonel of the 9th Mississippi Cavalry Regiment, and led his regiment from the Atlanta Campaign until the end of the war. In 1865 he was arrested for participating in "alleged illegal cotton trading." He ended his Confederate service with the title colonel which was extended to him as an honorific for the remainder of his life.

Miller became law partners with R. V. Booth in 1872. Booth later described him as a "convivial friend and companion." Miller died of heart disease at Vicksburg in 1877. He is buried at Cedar Hill Cemetery in Vicksburg. He had at least four children who survived to adulthood.
