= 1st Kentucky Cavalry Regiment (Confederate) =

1st Kentucky Cavalry Regiment 1st (3rd) Kentucky Cavalry 3rd (Butler's) Kentucky Cavalry Regiment
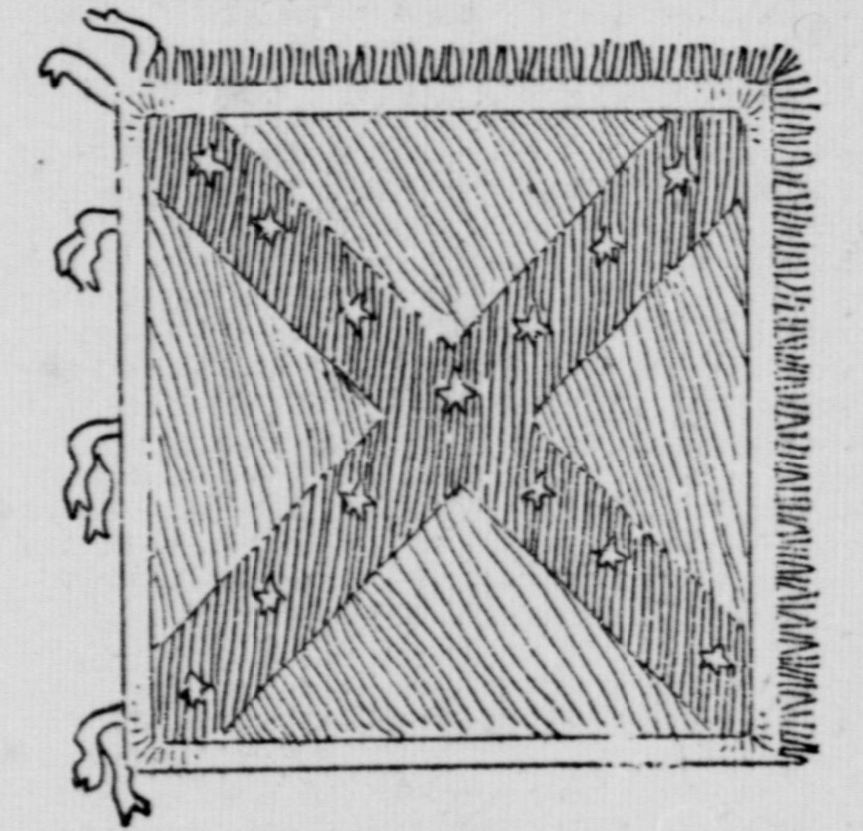
- Regimental flag
- Active: October 28, 1861–April 26, 1865 (1st); Summer 1862–April 26, 1865 (3rd)
- Country: Confederate States of America
- Allegiance: Kentucky
- Branch: Confederate States Army
- Type: Regiment
- Role: Cavalry
- Size: 698 (1st, total); 1.515 (3rd, total)
- Engagements: American Civil War: Battle of Perryville; Battle of Stones River; Tullahoma Campaign; Battle of Chickamauga; Siege of Chattanooga; Atlanta Campaign; Savannah Campaign; Carolinas campaign

Commanders
- Notable commanders: Col. Benjamin Hardin Helm; Col. John Adams; Col. J. Russell Butler

The 1st Kentucky Cavalry Regiment was a cavalry regiment in the Confederate States Army during the American Civil War; serving mostly in the Army of Tennessee. In late 1862 it was consolidated to constitute the 1st (3rd) Kentucky Cavalry, usually known as 3rd (Butler's) Kentucky Cavalry. The 3rd continued to serve for the duration of the war.

== Service ==
The 1st Kentucky Cavalry was organized at Bowling Green, Kentucky and was mustered into the Confederate States Army on October 28, 1861, under the command of Col. Benjamin Hardin Helm. It spent the winter of 1861–1862 in Kentucky, and accompanied the Army of Central Kentucky during its withdrawal through Tennessee to Corinth, Mississippi.

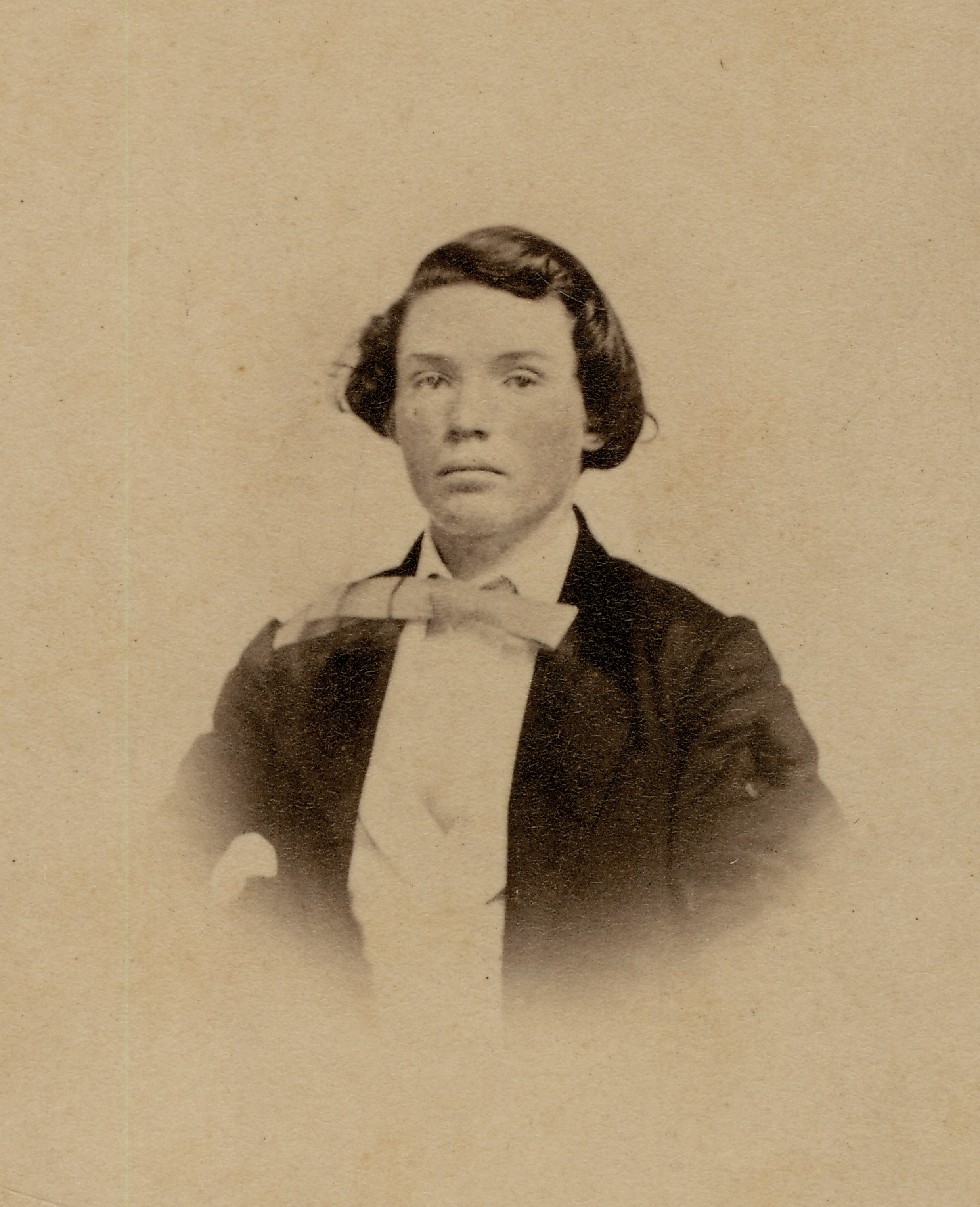
Carolus J. Peddicord, Company A, 1st Kentucky Cavalry.

While the Confederate Army launched its surprise attack at Shiloh, Helm and the regiment performed detached service in northern Alabama, where it patrolled the Tennessee River and safeguarded the extreme right of the Confederate operations from being flanked by potential Union approaches from central Tennessee. Helm was promoted shortly thereafter and given command of an infantry brigade. Colonel John Adams arrived from Memphis and was assigned command of the regiment. Adams led the regiment through the summer of 1862, operating in northern Alabama and southeast Tennessee. On June 4, they were routed at Sweetens Cove in the lead-up to the First Battle of Chattanooga.

The regiment briefly served in the Orphan Brigade before being brigaded with the 8th Texas Cavalry under the overall command of Joseph Wheeler.

In October 1862 the depleted regiment was reformed as battalion and consolidated with the newly organized 3rd Kentucky Cavalry of Col. J. Russell Butler.

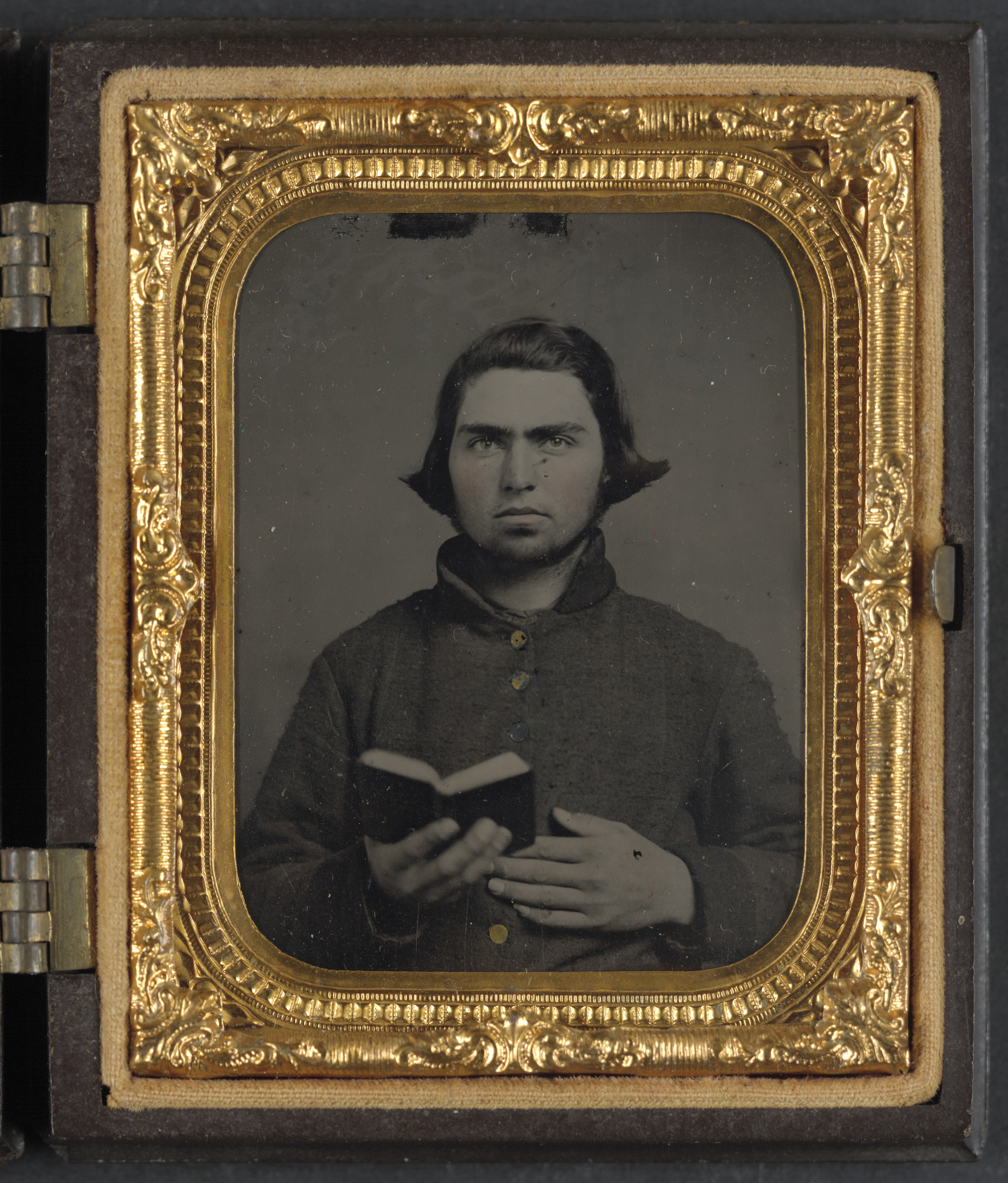
Private Thomas McCreary of Co. E, 3rd Kentucky Cavalry Regiment.

In this composition it continued to serve in the Army of Tennessee for the duration of the war; usually as part of the Kentucky Cavalry Brigade in Gen. Wheeler's Corps. It surrendered with the army near Bennett Place in North Carolina on April 26, 1865.

== Commanders ==
- Col. Benjamin Hardin Helm
- Ltc. Thomas G. Woodward
- Col. John Adams
- Maj. J. W. Caldwell
- Col. J. Russell Butler
- Ltc. Jacob Wark Griffith

== See also ==
- List of Kentucky Confederate Civil War units
