= Lloyd Tilghman House =

Historic house in Kentucky, United States

- Tilghman-Woolfolk House
- U.S. National Register of Historic Places
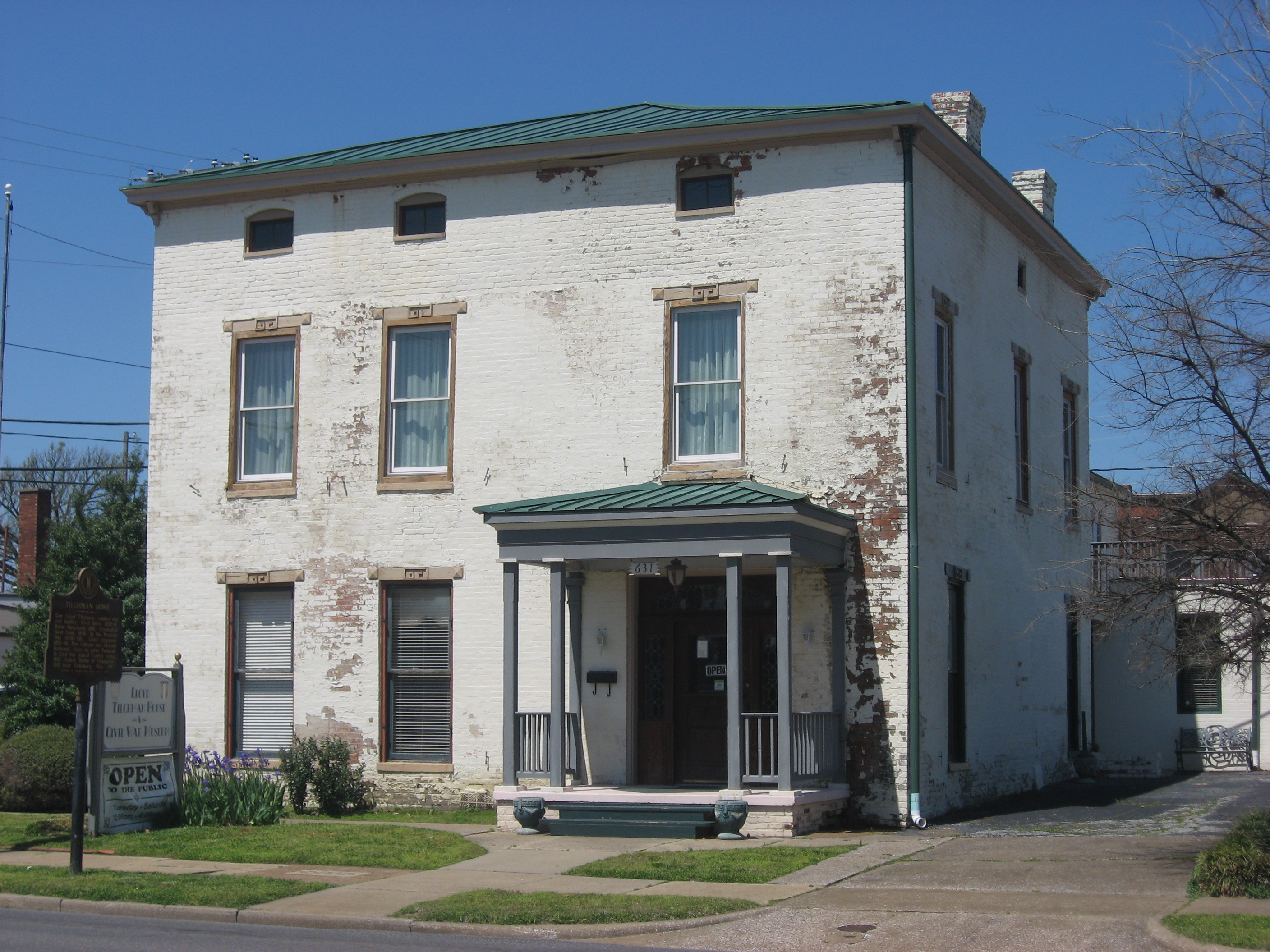
- Front and side of the house

- Location within Kentucky Location within the United States
- Location: 631 Kentucky Ave., Paducah, Kentucky 42003
- Coordinates: 37°5′4″N 88°36′4″W
- Built: 1861
- Architectural style: Greek Revival
- MPS: Caught in the Middle: The Civil War on the Lower Ohio River MPS
- NRHP reference No.: 98000940
- Added to NRHP: August 13, 1998

The Lloyd Tilghman House is a historic house in downtown Paducah, Kentucky, United States. It is also known as the Tilghman-Woolfolk House and the Lloyd Tilghman House and Civil War Museum.

== Early years ==
The Greek Revival house was built in 1852 by Robert Woolfolk on behalf of Lloyd Tilghman, who moved with his family to Paducah that year. Tilghman was a United States Military Academy graduate, having finished 46th out of 49 in his class, but spent less than a year as a Second Lieutenant. He moved to Paducah, then a community of 3,000 people, due to being assigned there by his employer, the New Orleans and Ohio Railroad, as a railroad civil engineer for the first railroad to connect Paducah to major cities to the south. Tilghman did not purchase the house; Woolfolk remained the property owner. Tilghman and his wife, seven children, and five enslaved people called the residence home until 1861, although Tilghman spent much of his time working on a railroad in the Isthmus of Panama. At the time of his departure from the house, he was one of two colonels of the Kentucky State Guard. Tilghman left Paducah in June 1861, delaying his departure to delay officers loyal to the Union from leading the state militia in the pro-secession Paducah.

Woolfolk's family then moved into the house. When U.S. soldiers finally arrived in Paducah, their headquarters were directly across from the Woolfolk house. Woolfolk was pro-slavery and flew a Confederate flag in response, sparking a riot in December 1861 that included U.S. soldiers, particularly those of the 11th Indiana Regiment. The incident would begin U.S. Brigadier General Charles Ferguson Smith's decline as he saw his subordinate, Ulysses S. Grant, raised above him almost immediately.

Woolfolk was banished from Paducah and the United States to Canada on August 1, 1864, by U.S. Brigadier General Eleazer A. Paine. Two weeks later, his wife and family were also banished to Canada; eight of Woolfolk's household, four others from Paducah, and eleven from Columbus, Kentucky, joined Woolfolk into exile.

== Post-war ==
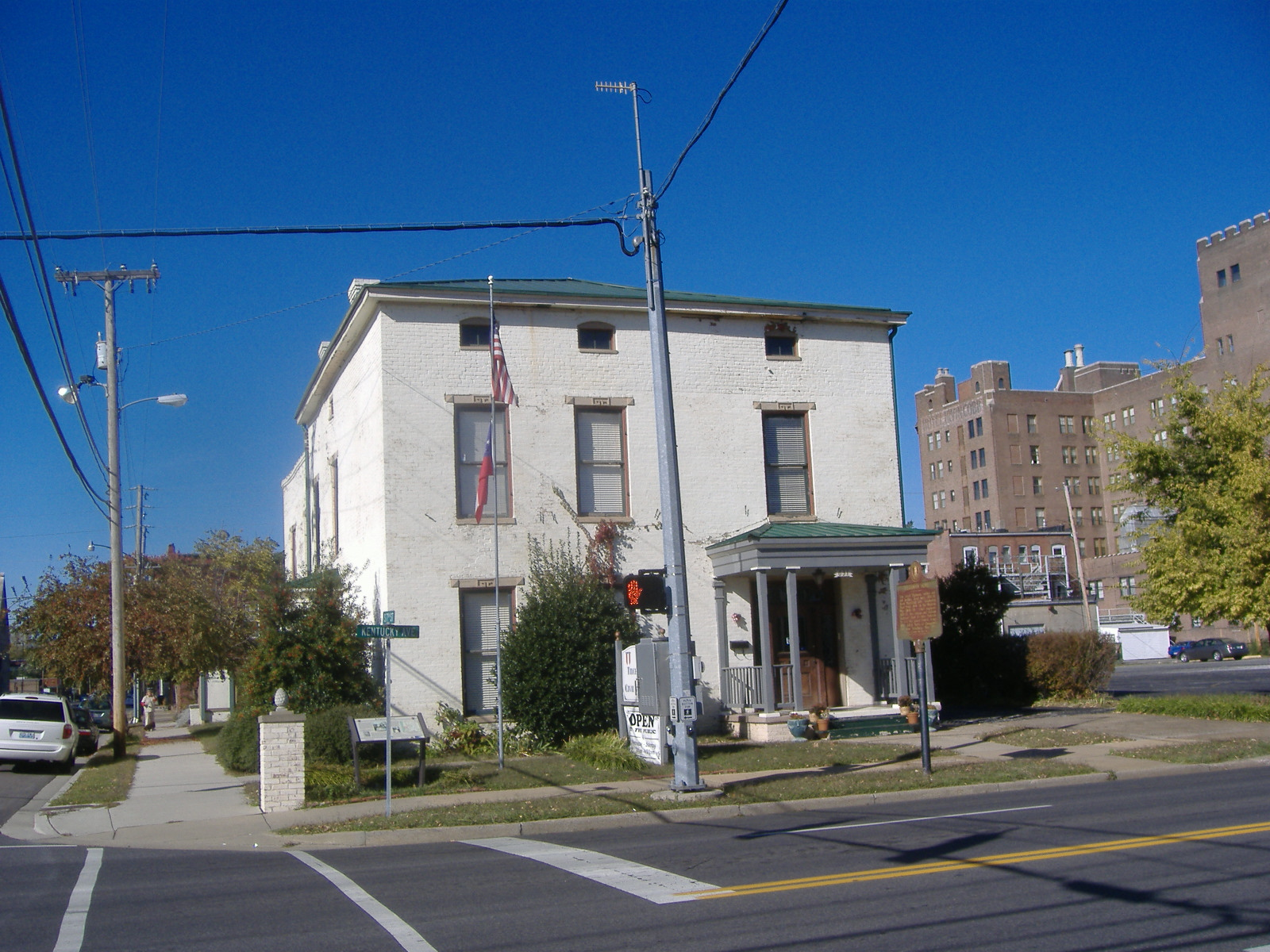
Tilghman House

After the war, the house was a residence until 1906, when it saw various commercial uses. It was slated for demolition in August 1986, but Growth, Inc. saved the building after work. In 1987 the roof was stabilized, and in 1992 it came under the care of the Tilghman Heritage Foundation. $150,000 was spent to save the building from 1986 to 1998.

It is now used as a Civil War Museum focusing on the western theater of the war. Upon its grand reopening on March 25, 2006, the museum focused on Western Kentucky's role in the war. On December 1, 2008, the Sons of Confederate Veterans purchased the home from the foundation, with each group paying half of the remaining $150,000 mortgage. The museum will keep its previous operation hours from 12:00 to 16:00, Wednesday through Saturday, from March to November.

== Gallery ==
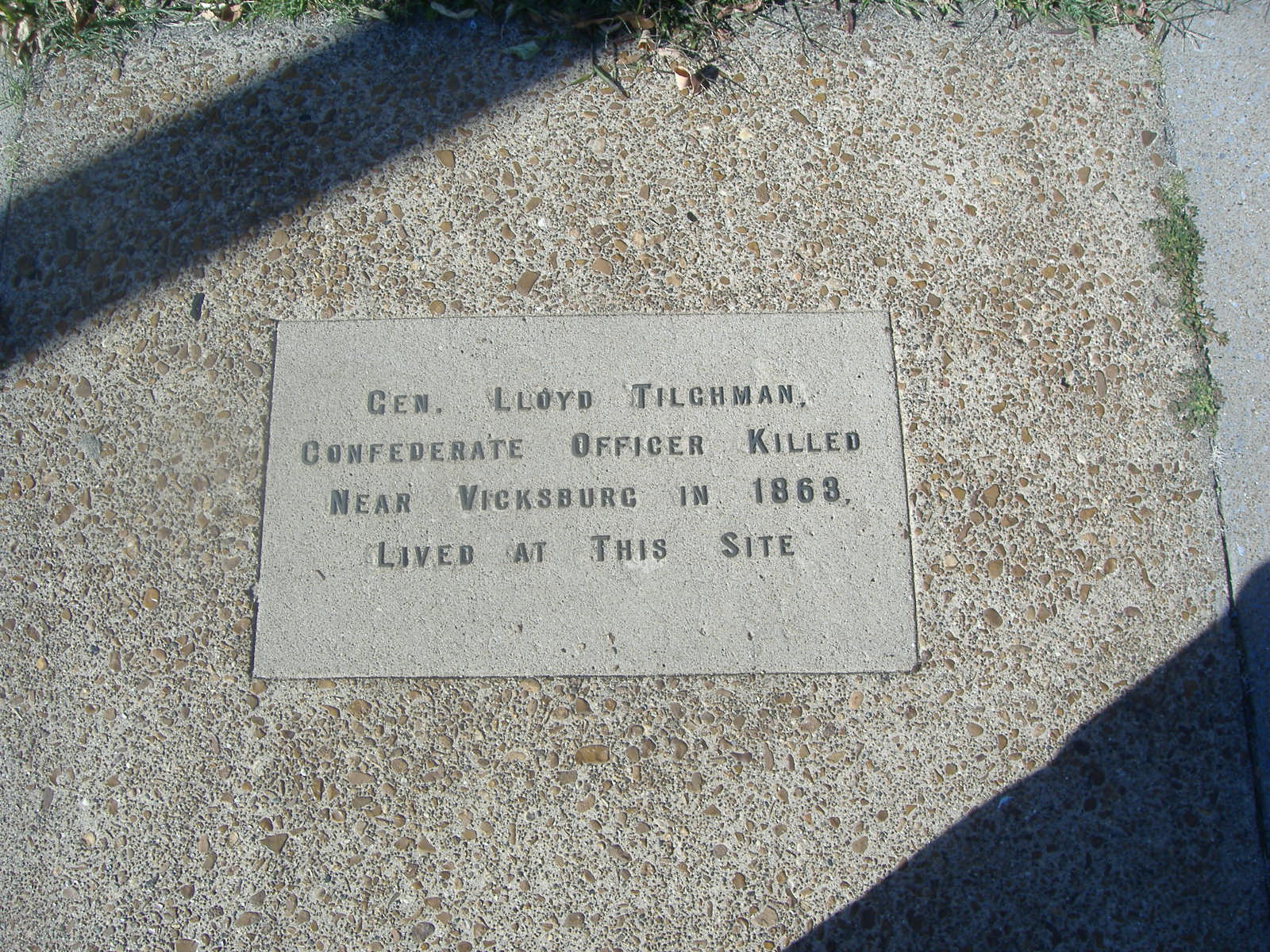
Sidewalk outside the House
