= 4th Illinois Cavalry Regiment =

- Illinois flag
- Active: September 26, 1861, to June 14, 1865
- Country: United States
- Allegiance: Union
- Branch: Cavalry
- Engagements: Fort Henry; Fort Donelson; Battle of Shiloh; Siege of Corinth; Battle of Coffeeville; Battle of Egypt Station

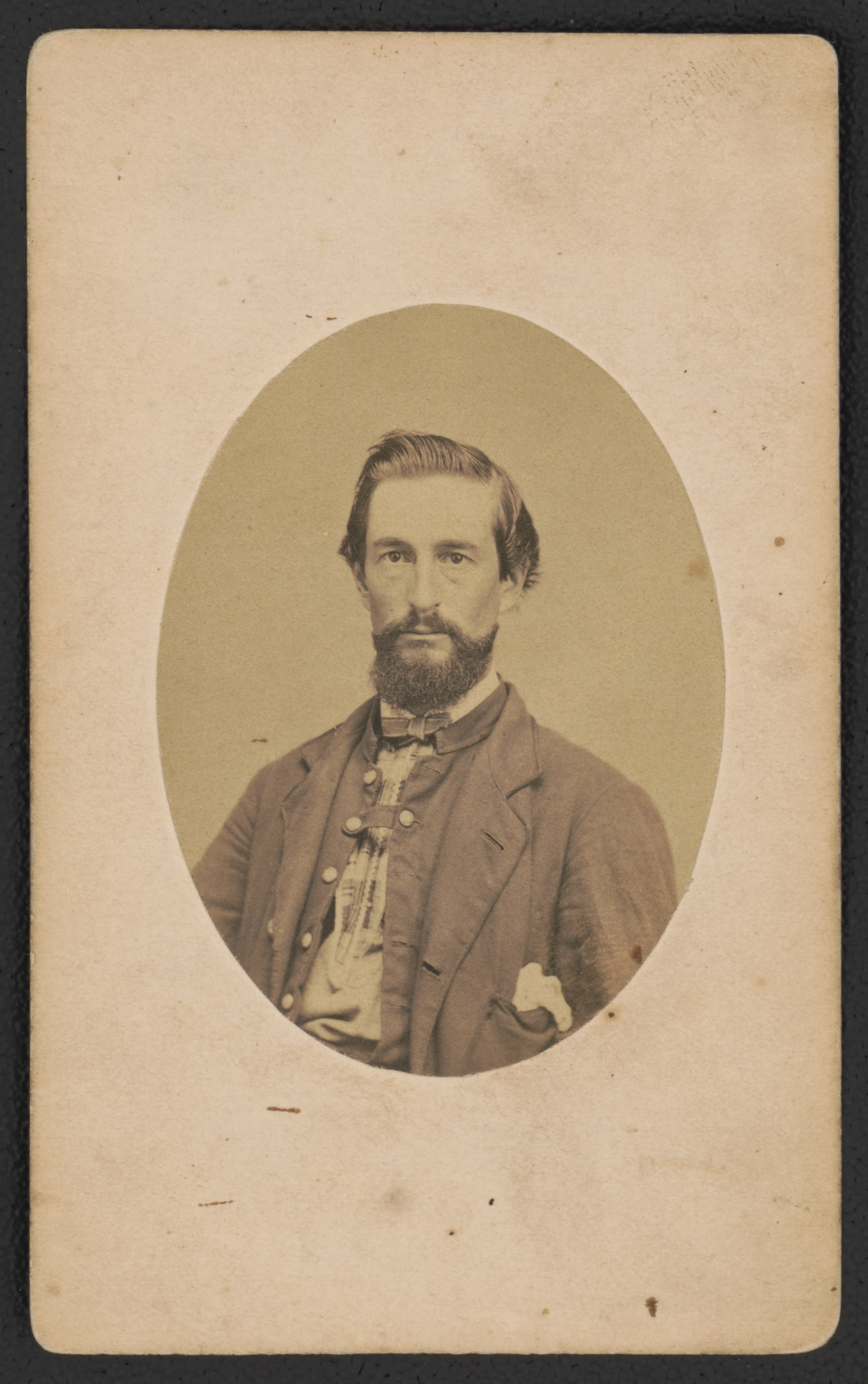
Wagoner John M. Moore of Co. K, 4th Illinois Cavalry Regiment. From the Liljenquist Family Collection of Civil War Photographs, Prints and Photographs Division, Library of Congress

The 4th Illinois Cavalry Regiment was a cavalry regiment that served in the Union Army during the American Civil War.

== Service ==
The 4th Illinois Volunteer Cavalry was mustered into service at Ottawa, Illinois, on September 26, 1861. It was consolidated with 12th Illinois Cavalry Regiment on June 14, 1865.

== Total strength and casualties ==
The regiment lost 1 officer and 31 enlisted men killed and mortally wounded and 1 officer and 166 enlisted men from disease, for a total of 199 fatalities.

== Commanders ==
- Colonel Theophilus Lyle Dickey - resigned February 16, 1863
- Colonel Martin R. M. Wallace - mustered out November 3, 1864

== See also ==
- List of Illinois Civil War Units
- Illinois in the American Civil War
