= 20th Arkansas Infantry Regiment =

- Active: 1862–1865
- Disbanded: May 26, 1865
- Country: Confederate States of America
- Allegiance: CSA
- Branch: Infantry
- Size: Regiment
- Engagements: American Civil War: Bombardment of Fort Pillow; Battle of Farmington; Iuka-Corinth Campaign; Battle of Corinth; Battle of Hatchie's Bridge; Battle of Coffeeville; Vicksburg Campaign; Battle of Port Gibson; Battle of Champion's Hill; Battle of Big Black River Bridge; Siege of Vicksburg; Camden Expedition; Expedition to Mount Elba; Battle of Prairie D'Ane; Battle of Marks' Mills; Battle of Jenkins Ferry; Price's Missouri Raid; Battle of Fort Davidson; Fourth Battle of Boonville; Battle of Glasgow, Missouri; Battle of Sedalia; Second Battle of Lexington; Battle of Little Blue River; Second Battle of Independence; Battle of Byram's Ford; Battle of Westport; Battle of Marais des Cygnes; Battle of Mine Creek; Battle of Marmiton River; Second Battle of Newtonia

The 20th Arkansas Infantry (1861–1865) was a Confederate Army infantry regiment during the American Civil War. The unit was also known as the 22nd Arkansas Infantry. When the unit was reorganized following its capture at the Siege of Vicksburg, it was officially redesignated as the 41st Arkansas Infantry (Mounted), by the Arkansas State Military Board, but this redesignation was completely ignored by the unit and Confederate authorities. The unit participated in the Camden Expedition and Price's Missouri Expedition as a mounted infantry unit.

== Organization ==
The 20th Arkansas infantry was originally organized as the 22nd Arkansas Infantry at DeValls Bluff, Arkansas, on April 9, 1862, with the following officers:

- Colonel George W. King.
- Lieutenant Colonel Alf Carrigan.
- Major James H. Fletcher.

The regiment was composed of volunteer companies from the following counties:

- Company A – the "Hempstead Legion" – Commanded by Captain Daniel Webster Jones, organized in Hempstead County, Arkansas, on March 1, 1862.
- Company B – the "McCulloch Avengers" – Commanded by Captain Henry Poston Johnson, organized in Hempstead County, Arkansas, on March 1, 1862.
- Company C – the "Worsham Avengers" – Commanded by Captain James G. Johnson, organized at Centerville, Arkansas, on February 26, 1862.
- Company D – Commanded by Captain Rufus M. Lindsey, organized in Little Rock, Arkansas, on March 1, 1862.
- Company E – the "Hempstead Plough Boys" – Commanded by Captain Cottingham, Jefferson, organized in Hempstead County, Arkansas, on March 1, 1862.
- Company F – Commanded by Captain R. E. Beebe, organized at Perryville, Perry County, Arkansas, on March 3, 1862.
- Company G – Commanded by Captain H. G. Robertson, organized in Pulaski County, Arkansas, on February 17, 1862.
- Company H – Commanded by Captain W. H. Wheeler, organized in Warren, Bradley County, Arkansas, on February 28, 1862.
- Company I – Commanded by Captain G. W. King, organized at Little Rock, Pulaskin County, Arkansas, on February 26, 1862.
- Company K – Commanded by Captain W. R. Kelley, organized at Bright Star, Lafayette County, Arkansas, March 6, 1862

== Battles ==
The 20th Infantry Regiment was ordered east of the Mississippi River along with the rest of General Earl Van Dorn's Army of the West. The regiment was added to a brigade commanded by Brigadier General Albert Rust. The unit boarded a steamer at Des Arc and moved down White River, out at its mouth, then up the Mississippi River and landed at Memphis, Tennessee, on April 11, 1862. The regiment was immediately ordered with the remainder of Rust's Brigade to Fort Pillow, approximately 50 miles north of Memphis. The unit departed Memphis via steamer on April 12 and arrived at Fort Pillow on April 13. It was here, during the bombardment of Fort Pillow by Union gunboats, that the men of King's regiment saw their first enemy fire.

The unit remained at Fort Pillow for fourteen days. The unit experienced few casualties in the bombardment during its stay at Fort Pillow, but many of the soldiers became sick, and several died due to the very muddy conditions and poor water supply at the fort. The unit left Fort Pillow on April 26 and moved back to Memphis. The unit left Memphis for the Corinth area on May 1, 1862.

In late April and early May 1862 the Confederate Army underwent an army-wide reorganization due to the passage of the Conscription Act by the Confederate Congress in April 1862. All twelve-month regiments had to re-muster and enlist for two additional years or the duration of the war; a new election of officers was ordered; and men who were exempted from service by age or other reasons under the Conscription Act were allowed to take a discharge and go home. Officers who did not choose to stand for re-election were also offered a discharge. The reorganization was accomplished among all the Arkansas regiments in and around Corinth, Mississippi, following the Battle of Shiloh. The 22nd was reorganized at Corinth, Mississippi, on May 8, 1862; and redesignated as the 20th Arkansas Infantry, in order to avoid confusion with McCord’s 22nd Arkansas Infantry Regiment. Upon reorganization at Corinth on May 8, 1862, the 22nd Arkansas was redesignated as the 20th Arkansas Infantry. The regimental officers chosen when the 20th was reorganized for the war were:

- Colonel Henry P. Johnson.
- Lieutenant Colonel James H. Fletcher.
- Major Daniel W. Jones.

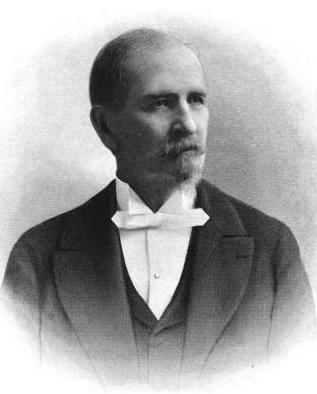
Colonel and later Governor Daniel Webster Jones

During the Iuka-Corinth Campaign, the 20th Arkansas was assigned to Brigadier General William L. Cabell's brigade of Brigadier General Dabney H. Maury's Division of Major General Sterling Price's Corps within the Confederate (Army of the West). The regiment was at and in the battle of Farmington, Second Corinth, and Coffeeville, Mississippi. During the Battles of Corinth and Hatchie's Bridge 92 casualties were reported. Colonel Johnson was killed at the battle of Corinth, and Lieutenant-Colonel Fletcher became colonel, but resigned on account of disability, when Major Daniel W. Jones was promoted to colonel, and Captain Robertson succeeded him as major of the regiment.

Following the Corinth Campaign, the regiment was reassigned to General Martin E. Green's brigade, in the Confederate Army of Mississippi, Department of Mississippi and East Louisiana. Part of Green's brigade, including many from the 20th Arkansas was captured and Major Robertson was killed in the Battle of Big Black in rear of Vicksburg on May 17, 1863. The remnants of the regiment fell back inside the works and endured the forty plus day Siege of Vicksburg. The prisoners from the 20th who were captured at Big Black were sent to prison camps in the north and eventually exchanged at City Point Virginia in December 1863.

The remainder of the regiment surrendered with the Army of Mississippi at Vicksburg, Mississippi, on July 4, 1863. General U. S. Grant initially demanded the conditional surrender of the Vicksburg garrison, but faced with the necessity of feeding 30,000 starving Confederates and having the idea that these soldiers might do more harm to the Confederate cause by being released to return home rather than being exchanged as whole units, he relented and allowed for the immediate parole of the unit. According to the Confederate War Department, the Union leader encouraged the surrendered Confederates to simply return home, rather than being officially paroled and exchanged. The able bodied Confederate soldiers who were released on parole walked out of Vicksburg (they were not allowed to proceed in any military formations) on July 11, 1863. Paroling of these able bodied men was completed in their respective regimental camps inside Vicksburg prior to July 11. The soldiers of the 15th Northwest Arkansas were paroled on July 8 and 9, 1863. Those who were wounded or sick in the various hospitals in Vicksburg were paroled, and were released, as soon as they could leave on their own. July 15/16 is the most common date of these Vicksburg hospital paroles. Some of the most seriously wounded and sick were sent by steamship down the Mississippi River and over to Mobile, Alabama, where they were delivered on parole to Confederate authorities.

Confederate commanders designated Enterprise, Mississippi as the rendezvous point (parole camp) for the Vicksburg parolees to report to after they got clear of the last Federal control point at Big Black Bridge. Most of the Arkansas units appeared to have bypassed the established parole camps, and possibly with the support, or at least by the compliancy, of their Union captors, simply crossed the river and returned home. Because so many of the Vicksburg parolees, especially from Arkansas, simply went home, Major General Pemberton requested Confederate President Davis grant the men a thirty- to sixty-day furlough. The furloughs were not strictly adhered to so long as the soldier eventually showed up at a parole camp to be declared exchanged and returned to duty. Those who went directly home were treated as if they had been home on furlough if they eventually reported into one of these two parole centers. The exchange declaration reports issued by Colonel Robert Ould in Richmond for various units in the Vicksburg and Port Hudson surrenders began in September 1863 based upon men who actually reported into one of the two parole camps. Pemberton eventually coordinated with the Confederate War Department and Confederate General Kirby Smith, commanding the Department of the Trans-Mississippi to have the Arkansas Vicksburg parolee's rendezvous point established at Camden, Arkansas.

Eventually exchanged, reorganized, and mounted, at Washington, Arkansas, in the fall of 1863, the 20th was attached to Dockery's Brigade in the Trans-Mississippi Department. During this period, the Arkansas State Military Board officially redesignated the regiment as the 41st Arkansas Infantry Regiment (Mounted). This designation was completely ignored by the unit and its commander, but the unit is occasionally referred to as the 20th Arkansas Cavalry.

Colonel Jones, who had been taken prisoner at Corinth and exchanged, was again a prisoner at the capitulation of Vicksburg. After being exchanged, the regiment re-entered the service as cavalry under Colonel Jones, and during the Camden Expedition in March and April 1864, was at the skirmishes on the Little Missouri and Prairie d'Ane, and the battles of Marks' Mills and Jenkins' Ferry in April 1864; and during Price's Missouri Raid river took part in the battles of Pilot Knob, Boonville, Independence and Marais des Cygnes, September and October 1864.

== Consolidation and surrender ==
In November 1864, the remnants of Gee/Johnson's 15th Arkansas, Dockery's 19th Arkansas and the 20th Arkansas Infantry Regiments were combined to form the 3rd Arkansas Consolidated Infantry Regiment. The 3rd Arkansas Consolidated was surrendered with General Kirby Smith's Department of the Trans-Mississippi on May 26, 1865. When the Trans-Mississippi Department surrendered, all of the Arkansas infantry regiments were encamped in and around Marshall, Texas, as war-ravaged Arkansas was no longer able to provide adequate sustenance to the army. The regiments were ordered to report to Shreveport, Louisiana, to be paroled. None of them did so. Some soldiers went to Shreveport on their own to be paroled, but the regiments simply disbanded without formally surrendering.

== See also ==
- List of Confederate units from Arkansas
- Confederate Units by State
