= 20th Mississippi Infantry Regiment =

- Active: 1861–1865
- Disbanded: April 26, 1865
- Country: Confederate States
- Allegiance: Mississippi
- Branch: Confederate States Army
- Type: Infantry
- Size: Regiment
- Battles: American Civil War: Battle of Fort Donelson; Yazoo Pass Expedition; Vicksburg Campaign; Grierson's Raid; Jackson Expedition; Atlanta campaign; Franklin-Nashville Campaign; Carolinas campaign

The 20th Mississippi Infantry Regiment was a unit of the Confederate States Army from Mississippi during the American Civil War. The Regiment fought in numerous battles in the Western theater, including the Battle of Fort Donelson in 1862, where most of the regiment was captured.

== History ==
The 20th Mississippi Infantry was organized in the summer of 1861 and sent to Virginia in August. The regiment took part in the Western Virginia campaign during the fall of 1861 under General John B. Floyd. Following this campaign, the regiment was sent to Kentucky in January 1862 and assigned to defend Fort Donelson. During the Battle of Fort Donelson, the 20th Mississippi guarded the evacuation of Confederate troops (including General Floyd) via riverboat, and most of the regiment was captured when the fort surrendered. Of the 500 men of the regiment engaged at Fort Donelson, 20 were killed, 58 were wounded, and 454 were captured. 45 of the wounded men escaped and later took part in the Second Battle of Corinth in October, 1862. The remainder of the regiment was exchanged and returned to service in the winter of 1862–63.

During the Yazoo Pass expedition, the 20th Mississippi was sent to defend Fort Pemberton from Union forces under Ulysses S. Grant who were attempting to travel down the Yazoo River to Vicksburg. Several companies of the 20th were mounted and dispatched to different points across Mississippi to oppose cavalry attacks during Grierson's Raid in the spring of 1863. During the Vicksburg campaign the regiment took part in several skirmishes, but it was posted outside the defensive lines of Vicksburg and subsequently was not captured when the city fell to Union forces on July 4. Under the command of General Joseph E. Johnston, the regiment took part in the withdrawal to Jackson in July, which resulted in Union capture of the state capital.

During the spring of 1864, the Regiment was part of a Confederate force sent to Jones County, Mississippi to arrest deserters and combat anti-Confederate insurgents led by Newton Knight. In the summer of 1864, the 20th Mississippi was sent to Georgia to take part in the Atlanta campaign, and the subsequent Franklin-Nashville Campaign. During these battles in Georgia and Tennessee the 20th Regiment took heavy casualties and was greatly reduced in strength. Following the Confederate defeat in Tennessee the regiment withdrew to Mississippi in early 1865.

In the final stages of the war, the Regiment was sent east to fight in the Carolinas campaign. Due to heavy losses among the remaining Mississippi units, the 20th Regiment was combined with the remnants of the 6th, 15th, and 23rd Mississippi into the consolidated 15th Infantry Regiment. This combined unit surrendered at Durham, North Carolina on April 26, 1865.

== Notable members ==
- James Z. George, Captain, captured at Fort Donelson. Later served as a brigadier general of the Mississippi State Troops and a US Senator after the war.
- Dabney H. Maury, briefly served as Lieutenant Colonel in 1861. Later promoted to Major General.

== Commanders ==
Commanders of the 20th Mississippi Infantry:

- Col. Daniel R. Russell
- Col. William N. Brown
- Lt. Col. Horace H. Miller, promoted to commander of the 6th Mississippi Cavalry, 1864.
- Lt. Col. Walter A. Rorer, killed at Franklin.

== Organization ==
Companies of the 20th Mississippi Infantry:

- Company A, "Miles McGeehee Rifles" of Bolivar County.
- Company B, "Hamilton Guards" of Monroe County.
- Company C, "Carroll Guards" of Carroll County.
- Company D, "Noxubee Riflemen" of Noxubee County.
- Company E, "Adams Rifles" of Harrison County.
- Company F
- Company G, "Barksdale Greys" of Winston County.
- Company H, "Morton Pine Knots" of Scott County.
- Company I
- Company K

== See also ==
- List of Mississippi Civil War Confederate units
