= William Edwin Baldwin =

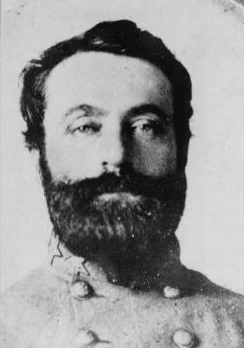
- Born: July 28, 1827; Mississippi, U.S.
- Died: February 19, 1864 (aged 36); Mobile County, Alabama
- Military career
- Allegiance: Confederate States of America
- Branch: Confederate States Army
- Service years: 1861–64
- Rank: Brigadier General
- Commands: 14th Mississippi Infantry
- Conflicts: American Civil War: Battle of Fort Donelson; Battle of Coffeeville; Battle of Port Gibson; Battle of Champion's Hill; Vicksburg Campaign

William Edwin Baldwin (July 28, 1827 – February 19, 1864) was a Confederate Army officer during the American Civil War.

He was a bookstore owner and he owned one slave. He was a member of the Mississippi Militia in Columbus, Mississippi, Baldwin enlisted in the Confederate Army soon after Mississippi announced its secession from the Union, accepting a commission as Colonel of the 14th Mississippi Infantry Regiment. Stationed briefly in Pensacola, Florida, he was transferred with his unit to East Tennessee and later central Kentucky, where he fought and was later captured at the Battle of Fort Donelson.

After being released in a prisoner exchange, he was promoted to the rank of brigadier general and sent to West Tennessee, where he assumed command of a mixed brigade of Mississippi and Tennessee soldiers. Winning distinction at the Battle of Coffeeville, Baldwin would later participate in the battles of Port Gibson and Champion's Hill during the Vicksburg Campaign. Baldwin was captured when Vicksburg fell. After being exchanged, he was assigned to the District of Mobile. There, he died in an accident when a broken stirrup caused him to fall off his horse, near the Dog River in Alabama.

== See also ==
- List of American Civil War generals (Confederate)
