= 6th Mississippi Infantry Regiment =

- Active: August 1861 - April 1865
- Country: Confederate States
- Allegiance: Mississippi
- Branch: Army
- Type: Infantry
- Size: Regiment
- Nickname: "The Bloody Sixth"
- Battles: American Civil War: Battle of Shiloh; Second Battle of Corinth; Battle of Port Gibson; Battle of Champion Hill; Siege of Vicksburg; Skirmishes with Knight Company; Atlanta campaign; Battle of Franklin (1864); Battle of Nashville; Carolinas campaign

Commanders
- Notable commanders: Robert Lowry

The 6th Mississippi Infantry Regiment was a unit of the Confederate States Army that fought in many battles of the Western theater of the American Civil War. After taking heavy casualties at the Battle of Shiloh, the 6th Regiment fought in the Vicksburg Campaign, operations against anti-Confederate guerillas in Jones County, Mississippi, the Atlanta campaign, and the Franklin-Nashville campaign.

== Formation ==
The volunteer companies that made up the 6th Mississippi were organized in the spring and summer of 1861, originally for state service, and were then mustered into Confederate service on August 24, 1861 at Grenada, Mississippi, with an original total strength of 601 men and officers. The colonel of the regiment was John Jones Thornton, a slaveowner and physician who had been a delegate to the Mississippi state secession convention in January 1861. Despite voting against leaving the Union and being the only delegate who refused to sign the state's ordnance of secession, Thornton quickly volunteered for the army soon after the convention adjourned. The Regiment was then sent Kentucky where it joined Patrick Cleburne's brigade. In Kentucky the Regiment suffered from serious outbreaks of disease that reduced the total effective strength at one point to only 150 men. The Regiment was moved to Corinth, Mississippi after the fall of Fort Donelson to Union forces in February, 1862.

== Shiloh ==
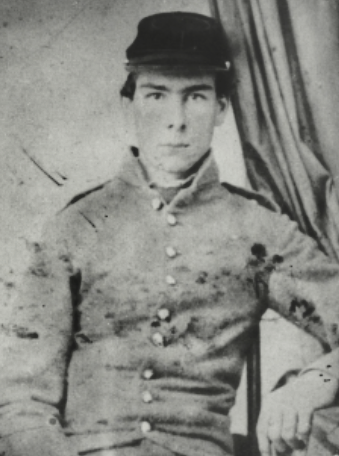
Captain Toliver Lindsay, 6th Mississippi Infantry

As part of Cleburne's brigade, in General William J. Hardee's Third Army Corps, the 6th Mississippi took part in the Battle of Shiloh on April 6–7, 1862. On the morning of April 6 the Regiment advanced against the Union lines at Rhea field alongside the 23rd Tennessee Infantry Regiment, but their advance was impeded by a bog and the obstacles of the Federal camp. The regiment took heavy fire from troops of the 53rd Ohio Infantry Regiment and Battery E, 1st Illinois Light Artillery Regiment, suffering severe casualties. The commander of the Regiment, Colonel John J. Thornton was wounded, and "a quick and bloody repulse was the consequence" of the Confederate advance, according to brigade commander Cleburne. 60 men of the Regiment reformed ranks for a counterattack led by Captain A.Y. Harper, and the Union forces retreated, but the 6th Mississippi had taken such heavy losses that it needed to be sent to the rear, as Cleburne reported: "Its terrible loss in the morning, the want of all its field and most of its company officers, had completely disorganized it and unfitted it for further service."

The 6th Regiment suffered a 76% casualty rate at Shiloh, earning it the nickname of "The Bloody Sixth". Cleburne's brigade as a whole suffered close to 1,000 casualties, the highest of any brigade engaged at the battle, Union or Confederate. A monument to the 6th Mississippi was dedicated at Shiloh National Military Park in 2015, located at Rhea field where the troops of the Regiment fell in battle. After Shiloh, the Regiment was sent to camp at Corinth and reorganized. Colonel Thornton resigned, Robert Lowry was elected as the new Colonel, and A.Y. Harper was promoted to Lieutenant Colonel. The Regiment was assigned to General John S. Bowen's brigade in Major General John C. Breckinridge's reserve corps and transferred to a supporting position near Vicksburg, Mississippi in the summer of 1862.

== Vicksburg and Knight Company ==
Bowen's brigade, including the 6th Regiment, was assigned to Major General Earl Van Dorn's corps and sent to fight at the Second Battle of Corinth in October. The brigade then acted as Van Dorn's rear guard during the retreat from Corinth, and later returned to the Vicksburg area to prepare for the Union advance on the city.

During the Vicksburg campaign, the 6th Regiment was assigned to General Lloyd Tilghman's brigade. In April, the 6th was sent to reinforce General Martin E. Green and General Bowen's troops, and on May 1 fought in the Battle of Port Gibson. The 6th Mississippi charged a Union battery during the battle at Port Gibson, taking heavy fire before retreating, and afterwards General Green reported that, "Colonel Lowry, of the Sixth Mississippi, deserves the highest commendation for his coolness and promptness in executing every order." At the Battle of Champion Hill on May 16, the Regiment engaged in skirmishes with Union troops, and brigade commander General Tilghman was killed by artillery fire.

The Regiment was moved within the Vicksburg defensive lines during the siege of the city, where it was captured along with the rest of the Confederate garrison on July 4, 1863.

After being exchanged and reorganized in 1864, the 6th Regiment was reassigned to General Leonidas Polk's Corps. In late March, Polk sent the 6th Regiment under Colonel Lowry's command to southern Mississippi to fight, in the word of Polk's order: "deserters and disloyal men." These men were Newton Knight's band of Unionist guerillas who had disrupted Confederate control of Jones County and the surrounding region. The Confederate troops under Lowry fought skirmishes with the guerillas and summarily executed 9 of Knight's men by hanging. Others who had deserted and were in hiding near their homes in south Mississippi were forced back into the Confederate ranks. Despite these efforts, the Confederate forces did not capture Knight or stop the flow of desertion and Unionist resistance in Mississippi. The 6th Regiment lost 1 killed and 2 wounded in operations against Knight's Company.

== 1864-1865 campaigns ==
In May 1864, the 6th Regiment was sent to Georgia to join General John Adams' brigade during the Atlanta campaign. The 6th fought at the Battle of Resaca, Battle of New Hope Church, Battle of Kennesaw Mountain, Battle of Peachtree Creek, and the Battle of Atlanta.

The Regiment then joined the Franklin–Nashville campaign, and Colonel Lowry of the 6th Mississippi took command of Adams' brigade after General Adams was killed in the Battle of Franklin on November 30. Lieutenant Colonel Thomas J. Borden took command of the regiment after Lowry's promotion, commanding the regiment at the Battle of Nashville in December.

During the final stages of the war, the 6th was sent to take part in General Joseph E. Johnston's Carolinas campaign, fighting at Kinston, North Carolina and the Battle of Bentonville in March 1865. The Regiment, along with the rest of Johnston's command, surrendered at Durham, North Carolina on April 26.

== Commanders ==
Commanders of the 6th Mississippi Infantry:

- Col. John J. Thornton, wounded at Shiloh, resigned 1862.
- Col. Robert Lowry, promoted to Brigadier General, 1865. Governor of Mississippi, 1882–1890.
- Lt. Col. Enoch R. Bennett
- Lt. Col. A.Y. Harper
- Lt. Col. Thomas J. Borden

== Organization ==
Companies of the 6th Mississippi Infantry:

- Company A, "Rankin Rough and Readies" of Rankin County.
- Company B, "New Guard" of Rankin County
- Company C, "Quitman Southerns" of Leake County.
- Company D, "Lowry Rifles" of Smith County.
- Company E, "Lake Rebels" of Scott County.
- Company F, "Crystal Springs Guard" of Copiah County.
- Company G "Rockport Steel Blades" of Copiah County.
- Company H, "Simpson Fencibles" of Simpson County.
- Company I, "Rankin Greys" of Rankin County.
- Company K, "East Mississippi Greys" of Scott County.

== See also ==
- List of Mississippi Civil War Confederate units
