= John Adams (Confederate general) =

Confederate Army officer (1825–1864)

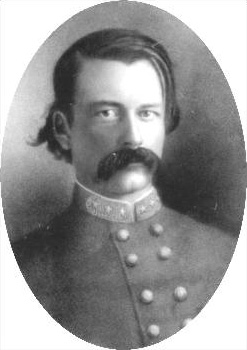
- Born: July 1, 1825; Nashville, Tennessee, U.S.
- Died: November 30, 1864 (aged 39); Franklin, Tennessee, U.S.
- Military career
- Allegiance: United States of America; Confederate States of America
- Branch: U.S. Army; Confederate States Army
- Service years: 1846–61 (USA); 1861–64 (CSA)
- Rank: Captain (USA); Brigadier General (CSA)
- Commands: 1st Kentucky Cavalry; Adams's Brigade
- Conflicts: Mexican–American War; Battle of Santa Cruz de Rosales; American Civil War; Atlanta campaign; Second Battle of Franklin †

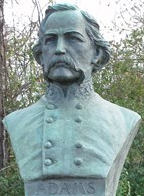
Bust of John Adams by Anton Schaaf (1915), Vicksburg National Military Park.

John Adams (July 1, 1825 – November 30, 1864) was an officer in the United States Army. With the onset of the American Civil War, he resigned his commission and joined the Confederate States Army, rising to the rank of brigadier general before being killed in action.

== Early life and career ==
Adams was born to Irish immigrant parents in Nashville, Tennessee, on July 1, 1825; by some other sources he was born in Pulaski, Tennessee, on February 8, 1825.

He graduated from the United States Military Academy in 1846, ranking 25th in his class. He was commissioned as a second lieutenant in the 1st Dragoons, serving under Capt. Philip Kearny. Adams was brevetted first lieutenant for gallantry during the Mexican–American War at the Battle of Santa Cruz de Rosales. After the war, Adams served on the western frontier, primarily in California, reaching the rank of captain. As a lieutenant colonel in the state militia, he was aide-de-camp to the Governor of Minnesota in 1853.

== Civil War Career ==
At the outbreak of the Civil War, Adams was serving at the remote outpost of Camp Hollenbush, California, when the news arrived of Fort Sumter and Lincoln's call for volunteers. Once it became apparent that his home state of Tennessee would secede, Adams resigned his U.S. commission on May 31, 1861, and departed for home aboard a steamship leaving San Francisco for New York City. Arriving in New York in July, he managed to evade arrest in the North and safely reach Confederate territory.

Adams would serve the entire war in the Western Theater. On arrival in Tennessee, he accepted commission as a captain of cavalry in the Confederate States Army. From fall 1861 to spring 1862, he commanded the Military Post of Memphis.

In April 1862, Adams left Memphis to join the Army of Mississippi at Corinth, where he was promoted to colonel and assigned command of the 1st Kentucky Cavalry after its commander, Benjamin Hardin Helm, was transferred to infantry command. Adams and the regiment spent May operating along the Tennessee River in northern Alabama and Elk River in southern Tennessee. On June 4, they were routed at Sweetens Cove in the lead-up to the First Battle of Chattanooga.

By August, Adams had been re-assigned to command of the Confederate arsenal at Columbus, Mississippi, where he served for the remainder of 1862. He was commissioned a brigadier general on December 29, 1862, and assigned command of the Fourth Military District in Jackson, where he commanded what was essentially a brigade, until May 1863, when the Confederates were forced to evacuate the city at the Battle of Jackson.

For the remainder of May, Adams commanded a cavalry brigade along the Big Black River in the vicinity of Vernon, Bentonia and Mechanicsburg. In early June 1863, he was assigned command of Lloyd Tilghman's infantry brigade in Maj. Gen. W.W. Loring's division. Tilghman had recently been killed weeks earlier at the Battle of Champion Hill.

Adams was commended in several official reports for his leadership. He was particularly conspicuous during the Atlanta campaign, where he again displayed personal bravery as well as a talent for battlefield tactics. His brigade was selected to lead the advance of John Bell Hood's army into Tennessee.

Adams was killed at the Second Battle of Franklin on November 30, 1864, while attempting to capture the colors of the 65th Illinois. He was one of six Confederate generals to perish in the defeat. An Indiana colonel who witnessed his death later wrote:

General Adams rode up to our works and, cheering his men, made an attempt to leap his horse over them. The horse fell upon the top of the embankment and the general was caught under him, pierced with [nine] bullets. As soon as the charge was repulsed, our men sprang over the works and lifted the horse, while others dragged the general from under him. He was perfectly conscious and knew his fate. He asked for water, as all dying men do in battle as the life-blood drips from the body. One of my men gave him a canteen of water, while another brought an armful of cotton from an old gin near by and made him a pillow. The general gallantly thanked them, and in answer to our expressions of sorrow at his sad fate, he said, 'It is the fate of a soldier to die for his country,' and expired. — Confederate Veteran, June 1897.

Adams left a widow with four sons and two daughters.

== See also ==
- List of American Civil War generals (Confederate)

== Sources ==
- Evans, Clement A. (1899). Confederate Military History. Atlanta: Confederate Publishing Company.

- Who Was Who in America: Historical Volume, 1607-1896. Chicago: Marquis Who's Who, 1963.
