= T. Lyle Dickey =

American judge

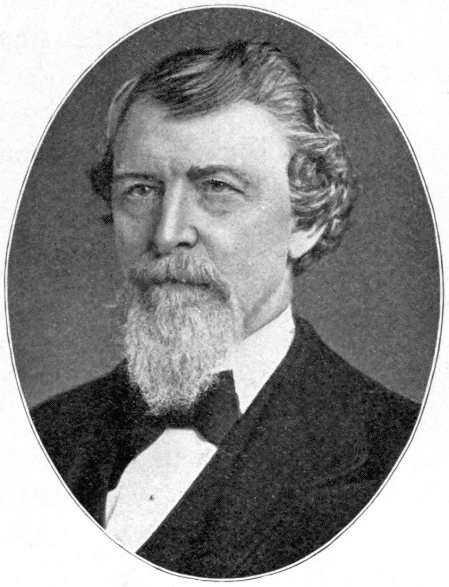
- Born: October 12, 1811; Paris, Kentucky
- Died: July 22, 1885 (aged 73); Atlantic City, New Jersey
- Military career
- Allegiance: United States
- Branch: United States Army: Union Army
- Service years: 1846, 1861–1864
- Rank: Colonel
- Commands: 4th Illinois Cavalry Regiment; Chief of Cavalry, Army of the Tennessee
- Conflicts: Mexican-American War; American Civil War: Battle of Shiloh
- Other work: Justice of the Illinois Supreme Court

Theophilus Lyle Dickey (October 12, 1811 – July 22, 1885) was an Illinois jurist and military leader.

== Pre-war life ==
Born in Paris, Kentucky, Dickey moved to Macomb, Illinois in 1834 to study law under Cyrus Walker and was admitted to the Illinois Bar in 1835. The next year, he moved to Rushville, Illinois where he edited a newspaper and speculated in real estate in addition to his legal practice. In 1839, he again moved, this time to Ottawa, Illinois where he continued his legal career. Upon the outbreak of the Mexican–American War he raised a company of volunteers and received a commission as captain. At the end of the war, he returned to Ottawa, Illinois and was elected a judge of the Illinois Ninth Judicial Circuit in 1848. He resigned his position as judge in 1851 but continued in the practice of law. He was a prominent political supporter of Stephen A. Douglas, making many stump speeches for him in 1858 and 1860.

== Civil War career ==
Dickey was authorized by the State of Illinois to raise a company of cavalry in August 1861. This company became the nucleus of the 4th Regiment Illinois Volunteer Cavalry, the recruitment of which resulted in a dispute between Colonel Dickey and Illinois Governor Richard Yates over the commissions to be granted to the officers of the regiment, a valuable tool of political patronage. In the end, Governor Yates accepted Colonel Dickey's choices and granted them their commissions. The 4th Illinois Cavalry completed its organization and was officially mustered into service on September 26, 1861. The regiment was sent to Cairo, Illinois soon after it was mustered in.

Colonel Dickey commanded the regiment during the advance of Grant's army on Fort Henry, serving as the scouts and screening force, served in a supporting role during the attack on that place, and then again led the advance on Fort Donelson.

Colonel Dickey's regiment was shipped to Pittsburg Landing, Tennessee where it participated in the Battle of Shiloh. Although camped near the front line when the battle begin, it was in no significant actions during the engagement and lost only six enlisted men wounded.

Dickey had a chance to save Grant's southward push through northern Mississippi in December 1862. Leading a cavalry expedition, he ran into the rear of Earl Van Dorn's force, but failed to engage or disrupt the Confederate movement. Van Dorn then led his men into Holly Springs, temporarily capturing Grant's logistical base and destroying much materiel. Grant was forced to retreat.

== Postwar career ==
From 1868 to 1870, he served as an Assistant Attorney General for the United States for all suits in the court of claims, and often argued before the United States Supreme Court in that role. Dickey was elected a justice of the Illinois Supreme Court in December 1875 and held that office until his death in Atlantic City on July 22, 1885.
