= Lloyd Tilghman =

Confederate States Army general

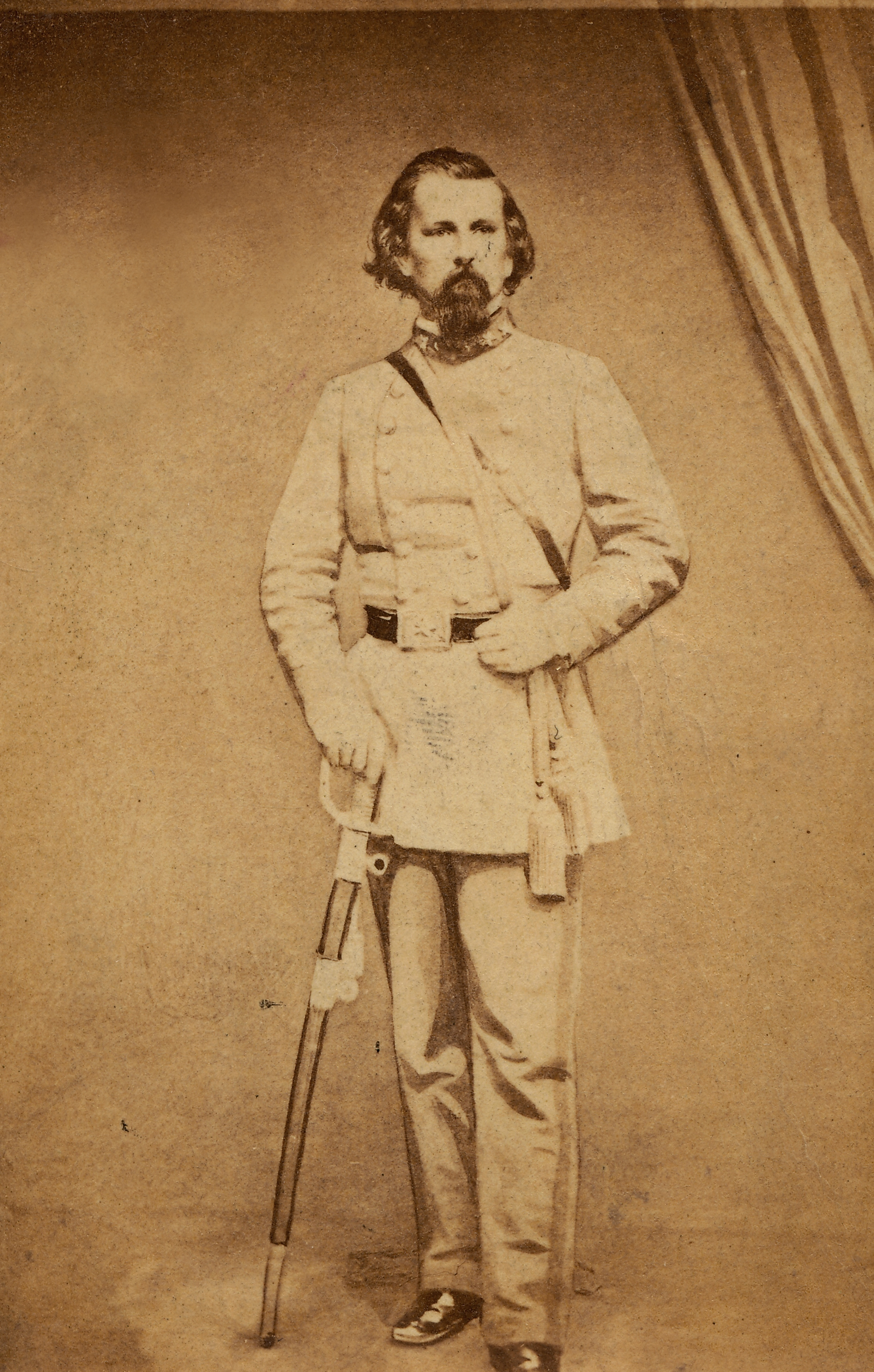
- Tilghman in uniform (c. 1861–1863)
- Born: January 18, 1816; Claiborne, Maryland, U.S.
- Died: May 16, 1863 (aged 47); Hinds County, Mississippi, U.S.
- Burial place: Woodlawn Cemetery, New York City, New York, U.S.
- Relatives: Oswald Tilghman (cousin)
- Military career
- Allegiance: United States of America; Confederate States of America
- Branch: United States Army; Confederate States Army
- Service years: 1836, 1847–1848 (USA); 1861–1863 (CSA)
- Rank: Captain (USA); Brigadier General (CSA)
- Conflicts: American Civil War; Battle of Fort Henry; Battle of Coffeeville; Battle of Champion Hill †

Lloyd Tilghman (January 18, 1816 – May 16, 1863) was a Confederate general in the American Civil War.

A railroad construction engineer by background, he was selected by the Confederate government to build two forts to defend the Tennessee and Cumberland rivers. The location of Fort Henry on the Tennessee was vulnerable to flooding, but Tilghman was slow to spot this, and his surrender of the fort to U.S. Grant in February 1862 was regarded as a disgrace. Taken prisoner and exchanged, he commanded a brigade in the Vicksburg campaign, and was killed by a shell at the Battle of Champion Hill, where he was widely praised for gallantry.

== Early life ==
Tilghman was born in "Rich Neck Manor", Claiborne, Maryland to James Tilghman who was the great-grandson of Matthew Tilghman, and Ann C. Shoemaker Tilghman. He attended the United States Military Academy and graduated near the bottom of his class in 1836. He was commissioned a brevet second lieutenant in the 1st U.S. Dragoons, but resigned his commission after three months. He worked as a construction engineer on a number of railroads in the South and in Panama, except for a period in which he returned to the Army as a captain in the Maryland and Washington, D.C. Volunteer Artillery (August 1847 to July 1848). In 1852, he took up residence in Paducah, Kentucky. He owned five slaves.

== Civil War ==
Tilghman was commissioned colonel of the 3rd Kentucky Infantry Regiment on July 5, 1861, shortly after the start of the American Civil War. He was promoted to brigadier general in the Confederate States Army on October 18. When General Albert Sidney Johnston was looking for an officer to create defensive positions on the vulnerable Tennessee and Cumberland Rivers, he was unaware of Tilghman's presence in his department and another officer was selected. However, the Richmond government pointed out Tilghman's engineering background and he was finally chosen for the task. The original sites for Forts Henry and Donelson were selected by another general, Daniel S. Donelson, but Tilghman was then placed in command and ordered to construct them. The geographic placement of Fort Henry was extremely poor, sited on a floodplain of the Tennessee River, but Tilghman did not object to its location until it was too late. (Afterward, he wrote bitterly in his report that Fort Henry was in a "wretched military position ... The history of military engineering records no parallel to this case.") He also was desultory in managing its needed construction and that of the small Fort Heiman, located on the Kentucky bank of the Tennessee, and quarreled with the engineers assigned to the task. He did manage to do a more creditable job on the construction of Fort Donelson, which was sited on dry ground, commanding the river.

On February 6, 1862, an army under Brig. Gen. Ulysses S. Grant and gunboats under Flag Officer Andrew H. Foote attacked Fort Henry and Tilghman was forced to surrender. (This was not his first encounter with Grant. Tilghman was in Paducah when Grant captured that city the previous September.) Prior to doing so, he led the vast majority of his garrison troops on the 12-mile road to Fort Donelson, and then returned to surrender with a handful of artillerymen who were left defending the fort. The biggest factor in the defeat of Fort Henry was not the naval artillery or Grant's infantry; it was the rising flood waters of the Tennessee, which flooded the powder magazines and forced a number of the guns out of action. (If Grant's attack had been delayed by two days, the battle would have never occurred because the fort was by then entirely underwater.) Tilghman was imprisoned as a prisoner of war at Fort Warren in Boston and was not released until August 15, when he was exchanged for Union general John F. Reynolds. He was replaced by Brig. Gen. John B. Floyd at Donelson, whose army surrendered to Grant on February 16.

Returning to the field in the fall of 1862, Tilghman became a brigade commander in Mansfield Lovell's division of Earl Van Dorn's Army of the West, following the Second Battle of Corinth. In the Vicksburg Campaign of 1863, he was hit in the chest by a shell and killed in the Battle of Champion Hill.

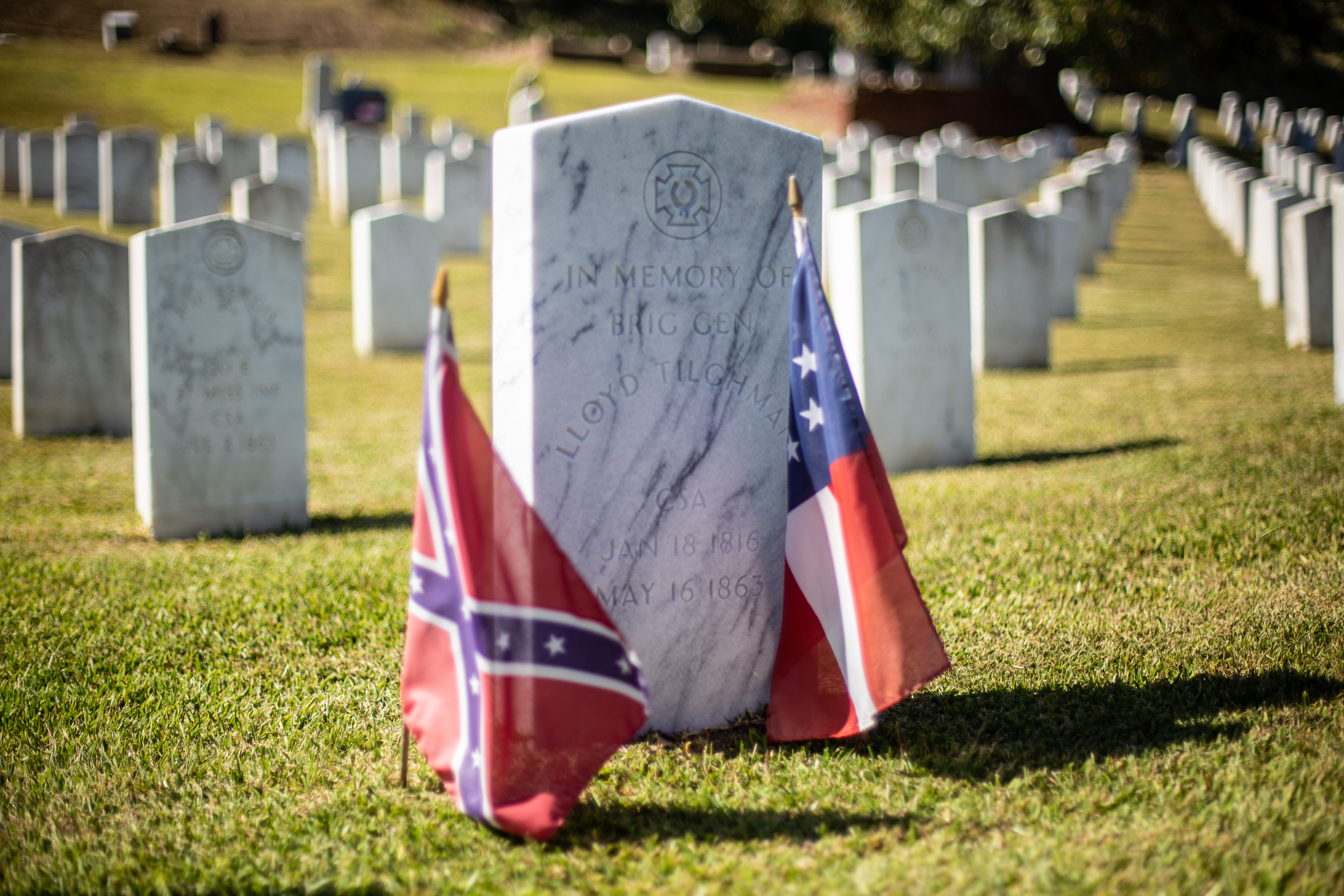
Tilghman's grave marker at Cedar Hill Cemetery

Tilghman was initially interred in the Soldiers Rest section of Vicksburg's Cedar Hill Cemetery. His body was moved in 1902 to Woodlawn Cemetery, The Bronx, where he was buried beside his wife who had moved to the city.

== Eyewitness accounts ==
Orderly Sergeant E. T. Eggleston

Tilghman came to our position, in an open field, on foot. He was in particular good humor. He wore a new fatigue uniform. When he arrived near our guns our officers were mounted, and were in position prescribed for dress parade, each Lieutenant, George H. Tompkins and Thomas J. Haines, in their positions, and Captain Cowan mounted on a large grey horse, making a conspicuous target for the Federal sharpshooters. We were all tyros in war at that time. The General in a pleasant manner said to our Captain, I think you and your Lieutenants had better dismount. They are shooting pretty close to us, and I do not know whether they are shooting at your fine grey horse or my new uniform. They very promptly obeyed the suggestion.

Having to go to headquarters daily with reports, I had become personally acquainted with the affable, gallant, and genial officer. Only a few minutes before his death we were sitting on a log near a strip of woodland discussing the line of battle we then held, comparing it with the one we had shortly before occupied. He got up from the log and went to one of our guns, a 12-pound Napoleon, Corporal Tommie Johnson, gunner, and remarked to him, I think you are shooting rather too high, and sighted the gun himself. He returned to a little knoll within a few feet of the log on which I was still sitting and was standing erect, his field glasses to his eyes, watching for the effect of the shot from our gun when he received the fatal wound not from a splinter from a shell, however, but from a solid shot. It is true that a horse was killed by the same missile and I noticed that the horse was dead some time before he General ceased to breathe, though he was unconscious.

It was some little time after the general fell before his son, a youth, could be found, and I shall never forget the touching scene when the grief and lamentations he cast himself on his dying and unconscious father. Those of us who witnessed this distressing scene shed tears of sympathy, for the bereaved son and of sorrow for our fallen hero, the chivalrous and beloved Tilghman.

Private James Spencer, 1st Mississippi Light Artillery

"General Tilghman and his staff rode up to Capt. Cowan and ordered him to open fire. The General dismounted and said to Capt. Cowan, I will take a shot at those fellows myself, and walked up to field piece No. 2 and sighted and ordered it fired and shell from the Federal Battery passed close to him while our gun was being reloaded. Tilghman remarked, ‘They are trying to spoil my new uniform.’ He then sighted the gun again and as he stepped back to order fire, a Parrott shell struck him in the side, nearly cutting him in twain. Just before he dismounted, he ordered his son, a boy of about 17 years to go with a squad and drive some sharpshooters from a gin house on our left, who were annoying our cannoneers. The son had been gone 10 or 15 minutes on this mission before his father was killed."

Emilie Riley McKinley: May 21, 1863

"Gen. Tilghman was carried to Mrs. Brien's house at night by torchlight. His hair was covered with blood. His son accompanied him. They thought at first of burying him in our churchyard but carried him to Vicksburg. Poor Gen. Tilghman – he was brave to a fault. We little thought a week ago when he passed this place that he would in so short a time be dead. I saw him last Fall in Jackson directly after his return from a prison at the North, Fort Warren. He made a speech at the Bowman House [hotel] and told us how cruelly he had been treated in prison. And now poor fellow, he is gone, but his name will live forever. He fell bravely defending his fireside and home. May he rest in peace."

Colonel A. E. Reynolds, 26th Mississippi Infantry, Commanding First Brigade. Report: Near Jackson, Miss., May 27, 1863 (Battle of Champion's Hill)

"At 5.20 o'clock, Brig. Gen. Tilghman, who up to that time had commanded the brigade with marked ability, fell, killed by a shell from one of the enemy's guns, and the command devolved upon me as the senior colonel present. I cannot here refrain from paying a slight tribute to the memory of my late commander. As a man, a soldier, and a general, he had few if any superiors. Always at his post, he devoted himself day and night to the interests of his command. Upon the battlefield cool, collected, and observant, he commanded the entire respect and confidence of every officer and soldier under him, and the only censure ever cast upon him was that he always exposed himself too recklessly. At the time he was struck down he was standing in the rear of a battery, directing a change in the elevation of one of the guns. The tears shed by his men on the occasion, and the grief felt by his entire brigade, are the proudest tribute that can be given the gallant dead."

General William W. Loring: Military Report

"During this time Tilghman, who had been left with his brigade upon the road, almost immediately after our parting, met a terrible assault of the enemy, and when we rejoined him was carrying on a deadly and most gallant fight. With less than 1,500 effective men he was attacked from by 6,000 to 8,000 of the enemy with a fine park of artillery, but being advantageously posted, he not only haled them in check, but repulsed him on several occasions, and this kept open the only line of retreat left to the army. The bold stand of his brigade under the lamented hero saved a large portion of the army. Quick and bold in the execution of his plans, he fell in the midst of a brigade that loved him well, after repulsing a powerful enemy in deadly fight, struck by a cannon-shot. A brigade wept over the dying hero; alike beautiful as it was touching."

== Posthumous commentary ==
Maria I. Johnston: Novel published 1869

Describing the arrival of Tilghman's body in Vicksburg, transported in a wagon and accompanied by his teenage son: "Stark and stiff lay the brave officer, his clothing and gloves covered with blood. And the gory stream congealing in the dark masses of his tangled hair."

Jefferson Davis, President, Confederate States of America (CSA), 1878

"The Greek who held the pass, the Roma who for a time held the bridge have been immortalized in rhyme and story. But neither of those more heroically, more patriotically, more singly served his country, than did Tilghman at Fort Henry, when approached by a large army, an army which rendered the permanent defense of the fort impossible, with a handful of devoted followers went into the fort and continued the defense until his brigade could retire in safety to Fort Donelson; then when that work was finished, when it was impossible any longer to make a defense, when the wounded and dying lay all around him, he, with the surviving remnants of his little band, terminated the struggle and suffered in a manner thousands of you have been prisoners of war know how to estimate. All peace and honor to his ashes, for he was among those, not the most unhappy, who went hence before our bitterest trials came upon us."

F.W.M. published account: July 13, 1893 @ Plant City, Florida

"General Tilghman directed the gun sergeant to train his gun, a 12-pound howitzer, and dislodge the enemy from the cabins. He dismounted from his horse and gave some directions about sighting the gun. While this was being done, a shell from one of the enemy's guns on the line exploded about fifty feet to the front. A ragged fragment of this shell struck the General in the breast, passing through him and killing the horse of his Adjutant a little farther to the rear. His death occurred, of course, very soon, and his remains were carried to the rear. That night they were started to Vicksburg, accompanied by his personal staff and son, Lloyd Tilghman, Jr., and the next evening they were buried in the city cemetery in Vicksburg. The last act of a brave man was to sight a field gun and direct the cutting of a shell fuse, so as to do the best execution upon the invaders of our country."

== In memoriam ==
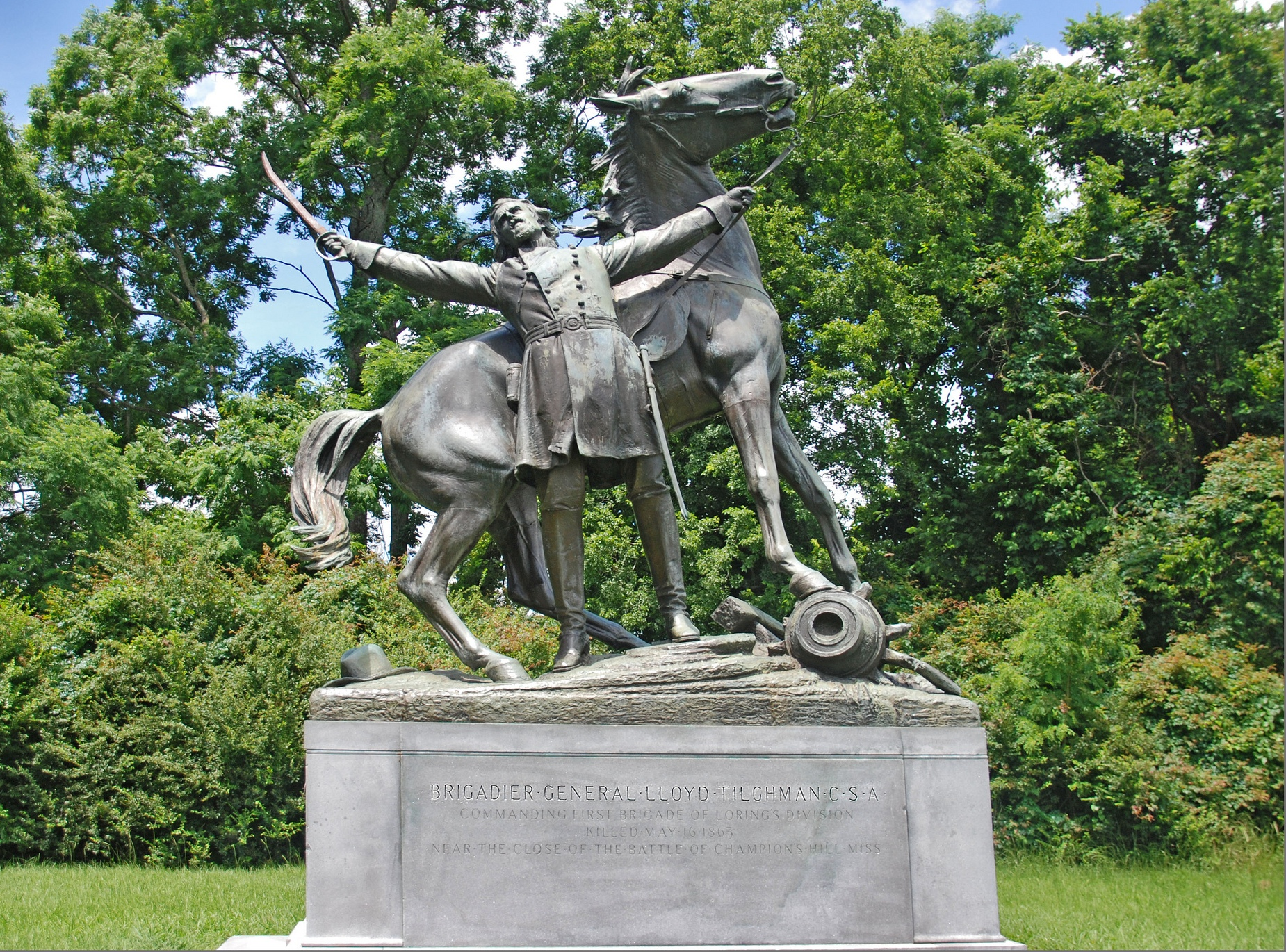
Tilghman monument in Vicksburg National Military Park

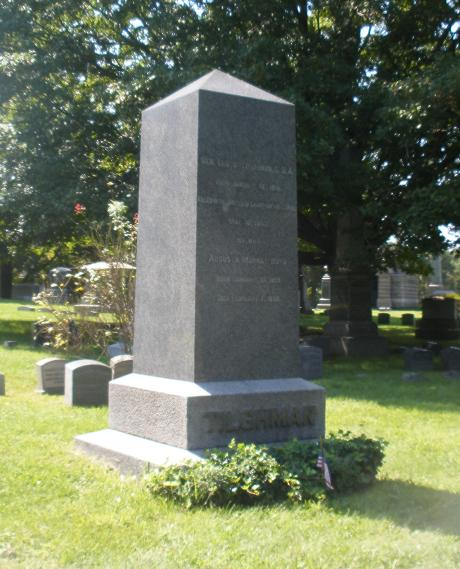
Tilghman monument in Woodlawn Cemetery, the Bronx

The Lloyd Tilghman House and Civil War Museum is located at the Tilghman homestead in Paducah. On May 19, 1926, a statue of Tilghman was dedicated at the Vicksburg National Historical Park.

== Tilghman's effects ==
A Presentation Confederate Flag and an inscribed sword and sword belt, worn by Tilghman when he was killed were sold by Heritage Auction Galleries on June 26, 2010. The items were passed down through his direct lineal descendants for almost 150 years until sold at auction.

== See also ==
- Kentucky in the American Civil War
- List of American Civil War generals (Confederate)
- Lloyd Tilghman House
- Samuel S. Boyd, brother-in-law
