= Carolinas campaign order of battle: Confederate =

The following units and commanders fought in the Carolinas campaign of the American Civil War. The Union order of battle is listed separately. Order of battle compiled from the army organization during the campaign.

== Background ==
The Confederate forces in the Carolinas campaign underwent a reorganization from April 8 to 10, 1865, which is shown below. For the Confederate order of battle previous to this reorganization, see the Bentonville Confederate order of battle.

== Military rank abbreviations used ==
- Gen = General
- LTG = Lieutenant General
- MG = Major General
- BG = Brigadier General
- Col = Colonel
- Ltc = Lieutenant Colonel
- Maj = Major

== Army of Tennessee ==
Gen Joseph E. Johnston
Escort

- Holloway's (Alabama) Cavalry Company: Capt E. M. Holloway

Second in command
Gen P.G.T. Beauregard
Escort

- Jeff. Davis Legion (Mississippi), Company A: Lt R. E. Conner

=== Hardee's Corps ===
LTG William J. Hardee
Escort and Scouts

- Raum's Cavalry Company (Mississippi): Capt William C. Raum
- Stono Scouts Company (South Carolina): Capt John B.L. Walpole, Lt Paul T. Gervais

Division	Brigade	Regiments and others
Brown's Division; MG John C. Brown	Smith's Brigade; BG James A. Smith	1st Florida Consolidated (comprised 1st, 3rd, 4th, 6th, and 7th Infantry and 1st Cavalry): Ltc Elisha Mashburn; 1st Georgia Consolidated (comprised 1st, 57th, and 63rd Regiments): Col Charles H. Olmstead; 54th Georgia Consolidated (comprised 37th and 54th Infantry Regiments and 4th Sharpshooters Battalion): Col Theodore D. Caswell
Brown's Division; MG John C. Brown	Govan's Brigade BG Daniel C. Govan	1st Arkansas Consolidated (comprised 1st, 2nd, 5th, 6th, 7th, 8th, 13th, 15th, 19th, and 24th Arkansas Regiments, and 3rd Confederate): Col Edward A. Howell; 1st Texas Consolidated (comprised 6th, 7th, 10th, and 15th Infantry, and 17th, 18th, 24th, and 25th Cavalry (dismounted) Regiments): Ltc William A. Ryan
Hoke's Division; MG Robert F. Hoke	Clingman's Brigade BG Thomas L. Clingman	8th North Carolina Infantry: Ltc Rufus A. Barrier; 31st North Carolina Infantry: Ltc Charles W. Knight; 36th–40th North Carolina Infantry: Lt Selby Hardenburgh; 51st North Carolina Infantry: Capt James W. Lippitt; 61st North Carolina Infantry: Capt Augustus D. Lippitt, Col William L. Devane
Hoke's Division; MG Robert F. Hoke	Colquitt's Brigade BG Alfred H. Colquitt	6th Georgia Infantry: Maj James M. Culpepper; 19th Georgia Infantry: Maj William Hamilton; 23rd Georgia Infantry: Col Marcus R. Ballenger; 27th Georgia Infantry: Col Charles T. Zachry; 28th Georgia Infantry: Ltc William P. Crawford
Hoke's Division; MG Robert F. Hoke	Hagood's Brigade Ltc James H. Rion; Col Robert F. Graham	11th South Carolina Infantry: Capt Benjamin F. Wyman; 21st South Carolina Infantry: Col Robert F. Graham, Capt J.A.W. Thomas; 25th South Carolina Infantry: Capt Edward R. Lesesne; 27th South Carolina Infantry: Capt Thomas Y. Simons; 7th South Carolina Battalion: Capt William Clyburn, Ltc James H. Rion
Hoke's Division; MG Robert F. Hoke	Kirkland's Brigade BG William W. Kirkland	17th North Carolina Infantry: Capt Stuart L. Johnston; 42nd North Carolina Infantry: Col John E. Brown; 50th North Carolina Infantry: Col George Wortham; 66th North Carolina/10th North Carolina Battalion: Col John H. Nethercutt
Hoke's Division; MG Robert F. Hoke	First North Carolina Junior Reserves Brigade Col Frank S. Armistead	1st North Carolina Junior Reserves: Ltc Charles W. Broadfoot; 2nd North Carolina Junior Reserves: Col John H. Anderson; 3rd North Carolina Junior Reserves: Col John W. Hinsdale; 1st North Carolina Junior Reserves Battalion: Capt J.L. Eaves
Cheatham's Division; MG Benjamin F. Cheatham; MG William B. Bate	Palmer's Brigade BG Joseph B. Palmer	1st Tennessee Consolidated (comprised 1st, 6th, 8th, 9th, 16th, 27th, 28th, and 34th Regiments, and 24th Battalion): Ltc Oliver A. Bradshaw; 2nd Tennessee Consolidated (comprised 11th, 12th, 13th, 29th, 47th, 50th, 51st, 52nd, and 154th Regiments): Ltc George W. Pease; 3rd Tennessee Consolidated (comprised 4th, 5th, 19th, 24th, 31st, 33rd, 35th, 38th, and 41st Regiments): Col James D. Tillman; 4th Tennessee Consolidated (comprised 2nd, 3rd, 10th, 15th, 18th, 20th, 26th, 30th, 32nd, 37th, and 45th Regiments, and 23rd Battalion): Col Anderson Searcy
Cheatham's Division; MG Benjamin F. Cheatham; MG William B. Bate	Gist's Brigade Col William G. Foster	46th Georgia Infantry: Ltc Abe Miles; 65th Georgia Consolidated (comprised 65th Regiment, and 2nd and 8th Battalions): Ltc Zachariah L. Watters; 16th–24th South Carolina Consolidated: Maj B. Burgh Smith
Artillery; Col Ambrosio J. Gonzales	Artillery Battalion Maj Basil C. Manly	Bridges's Battery (Louisiana): Capt William M. Bridges; Atkins's Battery (North Carolina): Capt George B. Atkins; Walter's Battery (South Carolina): Capt George H. Walter; Zimmerman's Battery (South Carolina): Capt William E. Zimmerman; Paris's Battery (Virginia): Lt Thomas M. Tucker
Artillery; Col Ambrosio J. Gonzales	Reserve Artillery Battalion Ltc Del Kemper	Guerard's Battery (Georgia): Capt John M. Guerard; Lumpkin's Battery (Georgia): Capt Edward P. Lumpkin; 1st Missouri Battery: Capt Aaron W. Harris; Charles's Battery (South Carolina): Capt William E. Charles; DePass's Battery (South Carolina): Lt A.A. Gilbert; C.E. Kanapaux's Battery (South Carolina): Capt Charles E. Kanapaux, Lt Thomas J. Sistrunk; Palmetto Light Artillery (South Carolina): Capt Frederick C. Schulz; Wagener's Battery (German Artillery, Companies A and C, South Carolina): Capt Frederick W. Wagener; Huggins's Battery (Tennessee): Capt Almaria L. Huggins

=== Stewart's Corps ===
LTG Alexander P. Stewart

Division	Brigade	Regiments and others
Loring's Division; MG William W. Loring	Featherston's Brigade BG Winfield S. Featherston	1st Arkansas Mounted Rifles Consolidated (comprised 1st and 2nd Mounted Rifles (dismounted), and 4th, 9th, and 25th Infantry Regiments): Col Henry G. Bunn; 3rd Mississippi Consolidated (comprised 3rd, 31st, and 40th Infantry): Col James M. Stigler; 22nd Mississippi Consolidated (comprised 1st, 22nd, and 33rd Regiments, and 1st Battalion): Col Martin A. Oatis; 37th Mississippi Battalion: Maj Q.C. Heidelberg
Loring's Division; MG William W. Loring	Lowry's Brigade BG Robert Lowry	29th Alabama Infantry: Maj Henry B. Turner; 12th Louisiana Infantry: Ltc E.M. Graham; 14th Mississippi Consolidated (comprised 5th, 14th, and 43rd Regiments): Col Robert J. Lawrence; 15th Mississippi Consolidated (comprised 6th, 15th, 23rd, and 26th Regiments): Ltc Thomas B. Graham
Loring's Division; MG William W. Loring	Shelley's Brigade BG Charles M. Shelley	1st Alabama Consolidated (comprised 1st, 16th, 26th, 33rd, and 45th (eight companies) Regiments): Col Robert H. Abercrombie; 17th Alabama: Ltc Edward P. Holcombe; 27th Alabama Consolidated (comprised 27th, 35th, 49th, 55th, and 57th Regiments): Col Edward McAlexander; 45th Alabama Infantry (companies C and H): Lt G.P. Bledsoe
Anderson's Division; MG Patton Anderson	Elliott's Brigade Ltc J. Welsman Brown	22nd Georgia Battalion: Maj Mark J. McMullen; 27th Georgia Battalion: Maj Alfred L. Hartridge; 2nd South Carolina Artillery: Maj Frederick F. Warley; Manigault's South Carolina Battalion: Capt Theodore G. Boag
Anderson's Division; MG Patton Anderson	Rhett's Brigade Col Alfred M. Rhett (c); Col William Butler	1st South Carolina Infantry (Regulars): Ltc Warren Adams; 1st South Carolina Artillery (Regulars): Ltc Joseph A. Yates; 15th South Carolina Battalion: Capt Theodore B. Hayne
Walthall's Division; MG Edward C. Walthall	Harrison's Brigade Col George P. Harrison Jr.	1st Georgia Regulars: Col Richard A. Wayne; 5th Georgia Infantry: Col Charles P. Daniel; 5th Georgia Reserves: Maj Charles E. McGregor; 32nd Georgia Infantry: Ltc E.H. Brown, Jr.
Walthall's Division; MG Edward C. Walthall	Kennedy's Brigade BG John D. Kennedy	2nd South Carolina Consolidated (comprised 2nd and 20th Regiments and detachment of Blanchard's Reserves): Col William Wallace; 3rd South Carolina Consolidated (comprised 3rd and 8th Regiments, 3rd Battalion, and detachment of Blanchard's Reserves): Col Eli T. Stackhouse; 7th South Carolina Consolidated (comprised 7th and 15th Regiments and detachment of Blanchard's Reserves): Col John B. Davis
Walthall's Division; MG Edward C. Walthall	Artillery Battalion Maj A. Burnett Rhett	Brook's Battery (Georgia): Capt John W. Brooks; LeGardeur's Battery (Louisiana): Capt Gustave LeGardeur, Jr.; Marion Light Artillery (South Carolina): Capt Edward L. Parker; Beaufort Light Artillery (South Carolina): Capt Henry M. Stuart; Chatham Light Artillery (Georgia): Capt John F. Wheaton

=== Lee's Corps ===
LTG Stephen D. Lee
Escort

- Ragland's Georgia Cavalry Company: Capt George G. Ragland

Division	Brigade	Regiments and others
Hill's Division; MG D.H. Hill	Sharp's Brigade BG Jacob H. Sharp	24th Alabama Consolidated (comprised 24th, 28th, and 34th Regiments): Col John C. Carter; 8th Mississippi Consolidated Battalion (comprised 5th, 8th, and 32nd Regiments and 3rd Battalion): Ltc James R. Moore; 9th Mississippi Consolidated (comprised 7th, 9th, 10th, 41st, and 44th Regiments, and 9th Sharpshooters Battalion): Ltc William C. Richards; 19th South Carolina Battalion Consolidated (comprised 10th and 19th Regiments): Ltc C. Irvine Walker
Hill's Division; MG D.H. Hill	Brantley's Brigade BG William F. Brantley	22nd Alabama Consolidated (comprised 22nd, 25th, 39th, and 50th Regiments): Col Harry T. Toulmin; 37th Alabama Consolidated (comprised 37th, 42nd, and 54th Regiments): Col John A. Minter; 24th Mississippi Consolidated (comprised 24th, 27th, 29th, 30th, and 34th Regiments): Col Robert W. Williamson; 58th North Carolina Consolidated (comprised 58th and 60th Regiments): Ltc Thaddeus Coleman
Hill's Division; MG D.H. Hill	Detachment, Army of Northern Virginia Ltc Alexander C. McAlister	Contingent from Lane's Brigade; 7th North Carolina Infantry: Maj James S. Harris; Contingent from Cooke's and Grimes' Brigades; 15th North Carolina Infantry, Companies B, F, and I; 27th North Carolina Infantry, Companies C, F, and G; 32nd North Carolina Infantry, Companies E and K; 43rd North Carolina Infantry, Company F; 45th North Carolina Infantry, Company I; 46th North Carolina Infantry, Companies B, D, G, and I; 48th North Carolina Infantry, Companies A and B; 55th North Carolina Infantry, Companies A and K
Stevenson's Division; MG Carter L. Stevenson	Henderson's Brigade; BG Robert J. Henderson	1st Confederate Consolidated Battalion (comprised 1st Confederate Regiment, 25th, 29th, 30th, and 66th Georgia Regiments, and 1st Georgia Sharpshooters Battalion): Capt William J. Whitsitt; 39th Georgia Consolidated (comprised 29th and 34th Regiments and detachments of 52nd and 56th Regiments): Col Charles H. Phinizy; 42nd Georgia Consolidated (comprised 36th and 42nd Regiments and detachments of 34th and 56th Regiments): Ltc Lovick P. Thomas; 40th Georgia Consolidated (comprised 40th, 41st, and 43rd Regiments): Ltc Stephen D. Clements
Stevenson's Division; MG Carter L. Stevenson	Pettus's Brigade BG Edmund W. Pettus	19th Alabama: Col Martin L. Woods; 20th Alabama Consolidated (comprised 20th and 30th Regiments): Ltc James K. Elliott; 23rd Alabama Infantry: Ltc Osceola Kyle; 27th Alabama Infantry, Company B: Lt Robert G. Hampton; 54th Virginia Consolidated (comprised 54th and 63rd Virginia): Ltc Connally H. Lynch
Stevenson's Division; MG Carter L. Stevenson	Artillery	Kanapaux's Battery (South Carolina): Capt John T. Kanapaux

=== Unattached units ===
Division	Brigade	Regiments and others
Naval units	Independent naval contingent	Naval Regiment: Flag Officer French Forrest
Naval units	Naval Brigade Rear Admiral and BG Raphael Semmes	1st Regiment; 2nd Regiment
Unattached artillery	Artillery Battalion Maj Joseph Palmer	Company A, 14th Georgia Light Artillery Battalion: Capt Minor W. Havis; Company D, 14th Georgia Light Artillery Battalion: Capt Ruel Wooten Anderson; Yates Battery (Mississippi): Capt James H. Yates; Sampson Artillery (North Carolina): Capt Abner A. Mosely
Unattached artillery	Independent Batteries	Abell's Light Artillery (Florida): Capt Henry F. Abell; Swett's Battery (Mississippi): Lt Harvey Shannon
Unattached artillery	Artillery Ltc Joseph B. Starr	1st North Carolina Artillery; Company C: Lt Alfred M. Darden; Company I: Capt Thomas L. Southerland; 3rd North Carolina Artillery Battalion: Maj John W. Moore; Company A: Capt Andrew J. Ellis; Company B: Capt William Badham; Company C: Capt John M. Sutton; 13th North Carolina Artillery Battalion: Company C: Capt James D. Cumming; Company E: Capt Henry Dickson; Chesterfield Artillery (South Carolina): Capt James I. Kelly

=== Cavalry Corps ===
LTG Wade Hampton
MG Matthew Butler

Division	Brigade	Regiments and others
Butler's Division; MG Matthew C. Butler; BG Evander M. Law	Logan's Brigade BG Thomas M. Logan	1st South Carolina Cavalry: Lt James A. Ratchford; 4th South Carolina Cavalry: Capt O. Barber; 5th South Carolina Cavalry: Capt George Tupper; 6th South Carolina Cavalry: Lt James A. Taggart; 19th South Carolina Cavalry Battalion: Lt W.H. Pagett
Butler's Division; MG Matthew C. Butler; BG Evander M. Law	Young's Brigade Col Gilbert J. Wright	Cobb's Legion Cavalry (Georgia): Capt R. Bill Roberts; Phillips Legion Cavalry (Georgia): Maj Wesley W. Thomas; 10th Georgia Cavalry: Capt Edwin W. Moise; Jeff. Davis Legion (Mississippi): Col J. Fred Waring
Butler's Division; MG Matthew C. Butler; BG Evander M. Law	Horse artillery	Earle's Battery (South Carolina): Capt William E. Earle; Halsey's Battery (South Carolina): Capt E. Lindsley Halsey

==== Wheeler's cavalry contingent ====
MG Joseph Wheeler
BG William W. Allen
Escort

- 1st Alabama Cavalry, Company G: Lt James M. Smith

Scout company

- Shannon's Special Scouts: Maj Alexander M.Shannon
- Engineer Troop: Lt L.C. Anderson

Division	Brigade	Regiments and others
Allen's Division; BG William W. Allen; Col C.C. Crews	Anderson's Brigade BG Robert H. Anderson	3rd Confederate Cavalry: Col Patrick H. Rice; 8th Confederate Cavalry: Ltc John S. Prather; 10th Confederate Cavalry: Capt W.H. Brazier; 5th Georgia Cavalry: Col Edward Bird
Allen's Division; BG William W. Allen; Col C.C. Crews	Crews' Brigade Col C.C. Crews; Col John R. Hart	1st Georgia Cavalry: Ltc George T. Watts; 2nd Georgia Cavalry: Ltc Francis M. Ison; 3rd Georgia Cavalry: Ltc James T. Thornton; 6th Georgia Cavalry: Col John R. Hart; 12th Georgia Cavalry: Capt James H. Graham
Allen's Division; BG William W. Allen; Col C.C. Crews	Hagan's Brigade Col David T. Blakey	1st Alabama Cavalry: Ltc Augustus H. Johnson; 3rd Alabama Cavalry: Capt A.P. Forney; 9th Alabama Cavalry: Lt Asl. Blansit; 12th Alabama Cavalry: Capt Albert G. Bennett; 51st Alabama Cavalry: Col Milton L. Kirkpatrick
Humes's Division; Col Henry M. Ashby	Ashby's Brigade Col James T. Wheeler	1st Tennessee Cavalry: Ltc James H. Lewis; 2nd Tennessee Cavalry: Ltc John H. Kuhn; 5th Tennessee Cavalry: Col George W. McKenzie; 9th Tennessee Cavalry Battalion: Maj James H. Akin
Humes's Division; Col Henry M. Ashby	Harrison's Brigade Col Baxter Smith	3rd Arkansas Cavalry: Maj William H. Blackwell; 4th Tennessee Cavalry; 8th Texas Cavalry; 11th Texas Cavalry
Dibrell's Division; BG George G. Dibrell	Breckinridge's Brigade; Col William C.P. Breckinridge	1st (3rd) Kentucky Cavalry; 2nd Kentucky Cavalry; 9th Kentucky Cavalry
Dibrell's Division; BG George G. Dibrell	McLemore's Brigade Col William S. McLemore	4th Tennessee Cavalry; 13th Tennessee Cavalry; Shaw's (Tennessee) Cavalry

=== Other ===
Brigades	Regiments and batteries
Post Greensboro BG Alfred Iverson; BG John D. Kennedy	Detachment of Lewis's Brigade (2nd, 4th, 5th, 6th, and 9th Kentucky Mounted Infantry): Lt J.M. McGuire; Buckner Guards (2nd Kentucky Cavalry Battalion, Company B and 4th Tennessee Cavalry, Company C): Lt Isaiah Yokum; Tucker's Regiment Confederate Infantry: Col Julius G. Tucker; Invalid Corps (North Carolina): Col Frank Parker; Other unattached troops and generals, including MG Lunsford L. Lomax, BG John Echols, and detached troops from Army of Northern Virginia
Post of Salisbury BG Bradley T. Johnson	Freeman's Battalion (North Carolina); Salisbury Prison Guard; Company A: Capt C.D. Freeman; Company B: Capt H.P. Allen; Company C: Sgt W.J. Whitaker; 1st Regiment North Carolina Detailed Men; Other hospital personnel, hospitalized troops, and other units
Post of Charlotte Col William J. Hoke	Hospital personnel and hospitalized troops

== Sources ==
- Bradley, Mark L. This Astounding Close: The Road to Bennett Place. Chapel Hill, North Carolina: University of North Carolina Press, 2000. ISBN 0-8078-2565-4
- U.S. War Department, The War of the Rebellion: a Compilation of the Official Records of the Union and Confederate Armies. Washington, DC: U.S. Government Printing Office, 1880–1901.
