= Carolinas campaign order of battle =

The order of battle for the Carolinas campaign includes:

- Carolinas campaign order of battle: Confederate
- Carolinas campaign order of battle: Union
