= Carolinas campaign order of battle: Union =

The following Union Army units and commanders fought in the Carolinas campaign of the American Civil War. The Confederate order of battle is listed separately. Order of battle compiled from the army organization during the campaign.

== Abbreviations used ==
=== Military rank ===
- MG = Major General
- BG = Brigadier General
- Col = Colonel
- Ltc = Lieutenant Colonel
- Maj = Major
- Cpt = Captain
- Lt = 1st Lieutenant
- Bvt = Brevet

== Union Forces ==
MG William T. Sherman
Headquarters guard:

- 7th Company Ohio Sharpshooters: Lt James Cox

Engineers:

- 1st Michigan Engineers & Mechanics: Col John B. Yates
- 1st Missouri Engineers (5 companies): Ltc William Tweeddale

Artillery: Bvt MG William Farquhar Barry

== Right Wing, Army of the Tennessee ==
MG Oliver O. Howard
Escort:

- Company K, 15th Illinois Cavalry: Cpt William Duncan
- 4th Company Ohio Cavalry: Cpt John L. King

Pontoon Train Guard:

- Company E, 14th Wisconsin: Cpt William I. Henry

=== XV Corps ===
MG John A. Logan

Division	Brigade	Regiments and others
First Division; Bvt MG Charles R. Woods	1st Brigade Bvt BG William Burnham Woods	12th Indiana: Col Reuben Williams; 26th Iowa: Maj John Lubbers; 27th Missouri: Col Thomas Curley; 31st Missouri/32nd Missouri (6 companies): Ltc Abraham J. Seay; 76th Ohio: Ltc Edward Briggs
First Division; Bvt MG Charles R. Woods	2nd Brigade Col Robert Francis Catterson	26th Illinois: Ltc Ira J. Bloomfield; 40th Illinois: Ltc Hiram W. Hall; 103rd Illinois: Ltc George W. Wright; 97th Indiana: Ltc Aden G. Cavins; 100th Indiana: Maj Ruel M. Johnson, Cpt John W. Headington; 6th Iowa: Ltc William H. Clune; 46th Ohio: Ltc Edward N. Upton
First Division; Bvt MG Charles R. Woods	3rd Brigade Col George A. Stone	4th Iowa: Maj Albert R. Anderson; 9th Iowa: Maj Alonzo Abernethy; 25th Iowa: Ltc David J. Palmer; 30th Iowa: Ltc Aurelius Roberts; 31st Iowa: Ltc Jeremiah W. Jenkins
Second Division; MG William Babcock Hazen	1st Brigade Col Theodore Jones	55th Illinois: Cpt Charles A. Andress; 116th Illinois: Ltc John E. Maddux, Cpt Necolas Geschwind; 127th Illinois: Ltc Frank S. Curtiss; 6th Missouri: Ltc Delos Van Deusen; 30th Ohio: Ltc Emerson P. Brooks; 57th Ohio: Ltc Samuel R. Mott
Second Division; MG William Babcock Hazen	2nd Brigade Col Wells S. Jones	111th Illinois: Col James Stewart Martin; 83rd Indiana: Cpt Charles W. White, Cpt William N. Craw; 37th Ohio: Ltc Louis von Blessingh; 47th Ohio: Col Augustus C. Parry; 53rd Ohio: Maj Preston R. Galloway; 54th Ohio: Ltc Israel T. Moore
Second Division; MG William Babcock Hazen	3rd Brigade BG John Morrison Oliver	48th Illinois: Ltc Thomas L. B. Weems; 90th Illinois: Ltc Owen Stuart; 99th Indiana: Cpt Josiah Farrar; 15th Michigan: Ltc Frederick S. Hutchinson; 70th Ohio: Ltc Henry L. Philips
3rd Division; Bvt MG John E. Smith	1st Brigade BG William Thomas Clark	63rd Illinois: Col Joseph B. McCown, Cpt Joseph R. Stanford; 93rd Illinois: Ltc Nicholas C. Buswell; 48th Indiana: Cpt Newton Bingham; 59th Indiana: Ltc Jefferson K. Scott, Maj Thomas A. McNaught; 4th Minnesota: Col John Eaton Tourtellotte, Cpt Leverett R. Wellman; 18th Wisconsin: Ltc Charles H. Jackson
3rd Division; Bvt MG John E. Smith	2nd Brigade Col Clark R. Wever	56th Illinois: Ltc John P. Hall; 10th Iowa: Ltc William H. Silsby; 17th Iowa (1 company): Cpt William Horner; 10th Missouri/26th Missouri (2 companies): Lt Theron Moses Rice; 80th Ohio: Ltc Pren Metham, Maj Thomas C. Morris
4th Division; Bvt MG John M. Corse	1st Brigade BG Elliott W. Rice	52nd Illinois: Ltc Jerome D. Davis; 66th Indiana: Ltc Roger Martin; 2nd Iowa: Col Noel B. Howard; 7th Iowa: Ltc James C. Parrott
4th Division; Bvt MG John M. Corse	2nd Brigade Col Robert N. Adams	12th Illinois: Ltc Henry Van Sellar; 66th Illinois: Ltc Andrew K. Campbell; 81st Ohio: Maj William C. Henry
4th Division; Bvt MG John M. Corse	3rd Brigade Col Frederick J. Hurlbut	7th Illinois: Ltc Hector Perrin; 50th Illinois: Ltc William Hanna; 57th Illinois: Maj Frederick A. Battey; 39th Iowa: Ltc Joseph M. Griffiths
4th Division; Bvt MG John M. Corse	Unassigned	29th Missouri Mounted Infantry: Col Joseph S. Gage; 110th US Colored Troops: Maj William C. Hawley, Cpt Thomas Kennedy, Cpt Zachary C. Wilson, Cpt Jacob Kemnitzer
Artillery Ltc William H. Ross		Battery H, 1st Illinois: Cpt Francis DeGress, Lt Robert S. Gray; Battery B, 1st Michigan: Lt Edward B. Wright; Battery H, 1st Missouri: Cpt Charles M. Callahan; 12th Wisconsin Battery: Cpt William Zickerick

=== XVII Corps ===
MG Francis Preston Blair Jr.
Escort:

- Company G, 11th Illinois Cavalry: Cpt Stephen S. Tripp

Division	Brigade	Regiments and others
First Division; MG Joseph A. Mower; BG Manning F. Force	1st Brigade BG John W. Fuller	64th Illinois: Maj Joseph S. Reynolds; 18th Missouri: Col Charles S. Sheldon, Ltc William H. Minter, Maj William M. Edgar; 27th Ohio: Maj Isaac N. Gilruth; 39th Ohio: Ltc Daniel Weber
First Division; MG Joseph A. Mower; BG Manning F. Force	2nd Brigade BG John W. Sprague	35th New Jersey: Col John J. Cladek; 43rd Ohio: Maj Horace Park; 63rd Ohio: Maj Oscar Lawrence Jackson; 25th Wisconsin: Ltc Jeremiah McLain Rusk
First Division; MG Joseph A. Mower; BG Manning F. Force	3rd Brigade Col Charles H. DeGroat; Bvt BG John Tillson	10th Illinois: Ltc David Gillespie; 25th Indiana: Ltc James S. Wright; 32nd Wisconsin: Ltc Joseph H. Carleton, Maj William H. Burrows
Third Division; Bvt MG Mortimer Dormer Leggett	1st Brigade BG Charles Ewing	20th Illinois: Cpt Henry King; 30th Illinois: Ltc William C. Rhoades, Cpt John P. Davis; 31st Illinois: Ltc Robert N. Pearson; 45th Illinois: Maj John O. Duer; 12th Wisconsin: Col James Kerr Proudfit; 16th Wisconsin: Col Cassius Fairchild
Third Division; Bvt MG Mortimer Dormer Leggett	2nd Brigade BG Robert Kingston Scott	20th Ohio: Ltc Harrison Wilson; 68th Ohio: Ltc George E. Welles; 78th Ohio: Col Greenbury F. Wiles, Ltc Gilbert D. Munson; 17th Wisconsin: Col Adam Gale Malloy
Fourth Division; Bvt MG Giles Alexander Smith	1st Brigade BG Benjamin F. Potts	14th/15th Illinois (battalion): Col George C. Rogers; 53rd Illinois: Col John W. McClanahan; 23rd Indiana: Ltc George S. Babbitt, Cpt John W. Hammond; 53rd Indiana: Col Warner L. Vestal; 32nd Ohio: Ltc Jefferson J. Hibbets
Fourth Division; Bvt MG Giles Alexander Smith	3rd Brigade BG William W. Belknap	32nd Illinois: Cpt John J. Rider; 11th Iowa: Ltc Benjamin Beach; 13th Iowa: Ltc Justin C. Kennedy; 15th Iowa: Maj George Pomutz; 16th Iowa: Maj John H. Smith
Artillery Maj Frederick Welker		Battery C, 1st Michigan: Lt William W. Hyzer; 1st Minnesota Battery: Cpt William Z. Clayton; 15th Ohio Battery: Cpt James Burdick
Unassigned		9th Illinois Mounted Infantry: Ltc Samuel T. Hughes

== Left Wing, Army of Georgia ==
MG Henry W. Slocum
Pontoniers:

- 58th Indiana: Ltc Joseph Moore

=== XIV Corps ===
Bvt MG Jefferson C. Davis
Provost guard: Ltc E. Hibbard Topping

- 110th Illinois (9 companies)
- Company A, 24th Illinois

Division	Brigade	Regiments and others
First Division; BG William P. Carlin; Bvt BG George P. Buell; BG Charles C. Walcutt	1st Brigade Bvt BG Harrison C. Hobart	104th Illinois: Maj John H. Widmer; 42nd Indiana: Maj Gideon R. Kellams; 88th Indiana: Ltc Cyrus E. Briant, Cpt William N. Voris, Maj Lewis J. Blair; 33rd Ohio: Cpt Joseph Hinson; 94th Ohio: Maj William H. Snider; 21st Wisconsin: Ltc Michael H. Fitch, Maj Charles H. Walker
First Division; BG William P. Carlin; Bvt BG George P. Buell; BG Charles C. Walcutt	2nd Brigade Bvt BG George P. Buell	13th Michigan: Col Joshua B. Culver, Maj Willard G. Eaton k, Cpt Silas A. Yerkes; 21st Michigan: Cpt Arthur C. Prince, Ltc Loomis K. Bishop; 69th Ohio: Cpt Jacob J. Rarick, Lt Samuel P. Murray, Ltc Joseph H. Brigham
First Division; BG William P. Carlin; Bvt BG George P. Buell; BG Charles C. Walcutt	3rd Brigade Col Henry A. Hambright	38th Indiana: Cpt David H. Patton; 21st Ohio: Ltc Arnold McMahan; 74th Ohio: Maj Robert P. Findley; 79th Pennsylvania: Cpt John S. McBride
2nd Division; Bvt MG James D. Morgan; Provost Guard: Company B, 110th Illinois: Cpt William R. Hester	1st Brigade BG William Vandever	16th Illinois: Cpt Herman Lund; 60th Illinois: Maj James H. McDonald; 10th Michigan: Cpt William H. Dunphy; 14th Michigan: Ltc George W. Grummond; 17th New York: Maj Alexander S. Marshall
2nd Division; Bvt MG James D. Morgan; Provost Guard: Company B, 110th Illinois: Cpt William R. Hester	2nd Brigade BG John G. Mitchell	34th Illinois: Ltc Peter Ege; 78th Illinois: Ltc Maris R. Vernon; 98th Ohio: Maj David E. Roatch; 108th Ohio: Ltc Joseph Good; 113th Ohio: Cpt Otway Watson; 121st Ohio: Maj Aaron B. Robinson
2nd Division; Bvt MG James D. Morgan; Provost Guard: Company B, 110th Illinois: Cpt William R. Hester	3rd Brigade Ltc James W. Langley	85th Illinois: Cpt James R. Griffith; 86th Illinois: Ltc Allen R. Fahnestock; 125th Illinois: Cpt George W. Cook; 22nd Indiana: Cpt William H. Snodgrass; 37th Indiana (1 company): Lt Socrates Carver; 52nd Ohio: Maj James T. Holmes
3rd Division; Bvt MG Absalom Baird	1st Brigade Col Morton C. Hunter	82nd Indiana: Ltc John M. Matheny; 23rd Missouri (4 companies): Maj John H. Jolly; 11th Ohio (detachment): Cpt Francis H. Loring; 17th Ohio: Ltc Benjamin H. Showers; 31st Ohio: Cpt Michael Stone, Cpt Eli Wilkin; 89th Ohio: Ltc William H. Glenn; 92nd Ohio: Ltc John C. Morrow
3rd Division; Bvt MG Absalom Baird	2nd Brigade Col Newell Gleason	75th Indiana: Ltc William O'Brien; 87th Indiana: Ltc Edwin P. Hammond; 101st Indiana: Ltc Thomas Doan; 2nd Minnesota: Ltc Judson W. Bishop; 105th Ohio: Ltc George T. Perkins
3rd Division; Bvt MG Absalom Baird	3rd Brigade Ltc Hubbard K. Milward; BG George S. Greene	74th Indiana: Ltc Thomas Morgan; 18th Kentucky: Maj John J. Hall, Ltc Hubbard K. Milward; 14th Ohio: Ltc Albert Moore; 38th Ohio: Cpt Charles M. Gilbert
3rd Division; Bvt MG Absalom Baird	Artillery Maj Charles Houghtaling	Battery C, 1st Illinois: Lt Palmer F. Scovel; Battery I, 2nd Illinois: Lt Judson Rich; 19th Indiana Battery: Lt Clinton Keller; 5th Wisconsin Battery: Cpt Joseph McKnight, Lt Elijah Booth Jr.

=== XX Corps ===
Bvt MG Alpheus S. Williams
MG Joseph A. Mower

Division	Brigade	Regiments and others
First Division; BG Nathaniel J. Jackson; Bvt MG Alpheus S. Williams	1st Brigade BG James L. Selfridge	5th Connecticut: Ltc Henry W. Daboll; 123rd New York: Col James C. Rogers; 141st New York: Ltc Andrew J. McNett; 46th Pennsylvania: Maj Patrick Griffith
First Division; BG Nathaniel J. Jackson; Bvt MG Alpheus S. Williams	2nd Brigade Bvt BG William Hawley	2nd Massachusetts: Cpt Edward A. Phalen; 13th New Jersey: Ltc Frederick H. Harris; 107th New York: Col Nirom M. Crane; 150th New York: Col Alfred B. Smith; 3rd Wisconsin: Ltc George W. Stevenson
First Division; BG Nathaniel J. Jackson; Bvt MG Alpheus S. Williams	3rd Brigade BG James S. Robinson	82nd Illinois: Ltc Edward S. Salomon; 101st Illinois: Ltc John B. LeSage; 143rd New York: Col Horace Boughton; 61st Ohio/82nd Ohio: Maj James S. Crall; 31st Wisconsin: Col Francis H. West
Second Division; Bvt MG John W. Geary	1st Brigade Col George W. Mindil; Bvt BG Ario Pardee Jr.	5th Ohio: Ltc Robert Kirkup; 29th Ohio: Ltc Jonas Schoonover; 66th Ohio: Ltc Eugene Powell, Cpt Theodore G. Keller; 28th Pennsylvania: Ltc James Fitzpatrick; 147th Pennsylvania: Ltc John Craig
Second Division; Bvt MG John W. Geary	2nd Brigade Col Patrick Henry Jones	33rd New Jersey: Ltc Enos Fourat, Maj Nathaniel K. Bray; 119th New York: Col John T. Lockman; 134th New York: Ltc Allan H. Jackson; 154th New York: Ltc Lewis D. Warner; 73rd Pennsylvania: Maj Christian H. Goebel
Second Division; Bvt MG John W. Geary	3rd Brigade Bvt BG Henry A. Barnum	60th New York: Ltc Lester S. Williams; 102nd New York: Maj Oscar J. Spaulding; 137th New York: Ltc Koert S. Van Voorhees; 149th New York: Maj Nicholas Grumbach; 29th Pennsylvania: Col Samuel M. Zulich; 109th/111th Pennsylvania: Col Thomas M. Walker
Third Division; Bvt MG William Thomas Ward	1st Brigade Col Henry Case; Bvt BG Benjamin Harrison	102nd Illinois: Col Franklin C. Smith; 105th Illinois: Ltc Everell F. Dutton; 129th Illinois: Ltc Thomas H. Flynn, Col Henry Case; 70th Indiana: Ltc Samuel Merrill; 79th Ohio: Ltc Azariah W. Doan
Third Division; Bvt MG William Thomas Ward	2nd Brigade Bvt BG Daniel Dustin	33rd Indiana: Ltc James E. Burton; 85th Indiana: Ltc Alexander B. Crane; 19th Michigan: Maj David Anderson; 22nd Wisconsin: Ltc Edward Bloodgood
Third Division; Bvt MG William Thomas Ward	3rd Brigade Bvt BG William Cogswell	20th Connecticut: Ltc Philo B. Buckingham; 33rd Massachusetts: Ltc Elisha Doane; 136th New York: Col James Wood; 55th Ohio: Maj Charles Preston Wickham; 73rd Ohio: Maj Thomas W. Higgins; 26th Wisconsin: Maj Francis Lackner
Third Division; Bvt MG William Thomas Ward	Artillery Maj John A. Reynolds; Cpt Charles E. Winegar	Battery I, 1st New York: Cpt Charles E. Winegar, Lt Warren L. Scott; Battery M, 1st New York: Cpt Edward P. Newkirk; Battery C, 1st Ohio: Lt Jerome B. Stephens; Battery E, Pennsylvania Light: Cpt Thomas S. Sloan

== Center, Army of the Ohio ==
MG John M. Schofield
Escort:

- Company G, 7th Ohio Cavalry: Cpt John A. Ashbury

Signal Corps: Cpt Edmund H. Russell
Engineers:

- 15th New York (3 companies): Maj Henry V. Slosson

Artillery: Ltc Terance J. Kennedy

=== X Corps ===
MG Alfred H. Terry
Escort: Company I, 20th New York Cavalry: Cpt John J. Carroll

Division	Brigade	Regiments and others
First Division; Bvt MG Henry Warner Birge	1st Brigade at Morehead City	
First Division; Bvt MG Henry Warner Birge	2nd Brigade at Wilmington	
First Division; Bvt MG Henry Warner Birge	3rd Brigade Col Nicholas W. Day	24th Iowa: Ltc Edward Wright; 38th Massachusetts: Ltc James P. Richardson; 128th New York: Cpt Henry H. Sincerbox; 156th New York: Cpt Alfred Cooley; 175th New York (5 companies): Cpt Charles McCarthey; 176th New York: Maj Charles Lewis
First Division; Bvt MG Henry Warner Birge	Artillery	22nd Indiana Battery: Lt George W. Alexander
Second Division; Bvt MG Adelbert Ames	1st Brigade Col Rufus Daggett	3rd New York: Ltc Alfred Dunham; 112th New York: Col Ephraim A. Ludwick; 117th New York: Cpt Edward Downer; 142nd New York: Col Albert M. Barney
Second Division; Bvt MG Adelbert Ames	2nd Brigade Col William B. Coan; Col John S. Littell	47th New York: Col Christopher R. MacDonald; 48th New York: Cpt Van Renssalaer K. Hilliard, Col William B. Coan; 76th Pennsylvania: Maj Charles Knerr; 97th Pennsylvania: Ltc John Wainwright; 203rd Pennsylvania: Ltc Amos W. Bachman
Second Division; Bvt MG Adelbert Ames	3rd Brigade Col G. Frederick Granger	13th Indiana: Ltc Samuel M. Zent; 9th Maine: Ltc Joseph Noble; 4th New Hampshire: Cpt John H. Roberts; 115th New York: Ltc Nathan J. Johnson; 169th New York: Col James A. Colvin
Second Division; Bvt MG Adelbert Ames	Artillery	16th New York Battery: Cpt Richard H. Lee
Third Division; BG Charles Jackson Paine	1st Brigade Bvt BG Delevan Bates	1st US Colored Troops: Ltc Giles H. Rich; 30th US Colored Troops: Ltc Hiram A. Oakman; 107th US Colored Troops: Col William H. Revere Jr.
Third Division; BG Charles Jackson Paine	2nd Brigade Bvt BG Samuel A. Duncan	4th US Colored Troops: Ltc George Rogers; 5th US Colored Troops: Col Giles W. Shurtleff; 39th US Colored Troops: Col Ozora P. Stearns
Third Division; BG Charles Jackson Paine	Unattached	Battery E, 3rd US Artillery: Lt John R. Myrick

=== XXIII Corps ===
MG Jacob Dolson Cox
Engineer Battalion: Cpt Oliver S. McClure
Provost Guard:

- Company H, 9th New Jersey: Cpt Edward S. Pullen

Artillery: Ltc George W. Schofield, Cpt Giles J. Cockerill

Division	Brigade	Regiments and others
First Division; Bvt MG Thomas H. Ruger	1st Brigade Bvt BG Israel N. Stiles	120th Indiana: Col Allen W. Prather; 124th Indiana: Col John M. Orr; 128th Indiana: Ltc Jasper Packard; 180th Ohio: Col Willard Warner
First Division; Bvt MG Thomas H. Ruger	2nd Brigade Col John C. McQuiston	123rd Indiana: Ltc Dewitt C. Walters; 129th Indiana: Col Charles A. Zollinger; 130th Indiana: Col Charles S. Parrish; 28th Michigan: Col William W. Wheeler
First Division; Bvt MG Thomas H. Ruger	3rd Brigade Col Minor T. Thomas	25th Massachusetts: Ltc James Tucker; 8th Minnesota: Maj George A. Camp; 174th Ohio: Col John S. Jones; 178th Ohio: Col Joab A. Stafford
First Division; Bvt MG Thomas H. Ruger	Artillery	Elgin Illinois Battery: Cpt Andrew M. Wood
Second Division; MG Darius N. Couch; BG Joseph Alexander Cooper	1st Brigade Col Orlando H. Moore; BG Joseph A. Cooper	26th Kentucky: Col Thomas B. Farleigh; 25th Michigan: Ltc Benjamin F. Orcutt; 132nd New York (& 99th New York, detachment): Col Peter J. Claassen; 52nd Pennsylvania: Ltc John B. Conyngham
Second Division; MG Darius N. Couch; BG Joseph Alexander Cooper	2nd Brigade Col John Mehringer	107th Illinois: Maj Thomas J. Milholland; 80th Indiana: Ltc Alfred D. Owen; 23rd Michigan: Col Oliver L. Spaulding; 111th Ohio: Ltc Isaac R. Sherwood; 118th Ohio: Ltc Edgar Sowers
Second Division; MG Darius N. Couch; BG Joseph Alexander Cooper	3rd Brigade Col Silas A. Strickland	91st Indiana: Ltc Charles H. Butterfield; 50th Ohio: Cpt John S. Conahan, Ltc James A. Bope; 181st Ohio: Ltc John E. Hudson, Col John O'Dowd; 183rd Ohio: Col George W. Hoge
Second Division; MG Darius N. Couch; BG Joseph Alexander Cooper	Artillery	19th Ohio Battery: Cpt Frank Wilson, Sr.
Third Division; BG James W. Reilly; BG Samuel P. Carter; Provost Guard: Company F, 100th Ohio: Lt John P. Denny	1st Brigade Col Oscar W. Sterl	12th Kentucky: Ltc Lawrence H. Rousseau; 16th Kentucky: Ltc John S. White; 100th Ohio: Cpt Frank Rundell; 104th Ohio: Ltc William J. Jordan; 8th Tennessee: Cpt James W. Berry
Third Division; BG James W. Reilly; BG Samuel P. Carter; Provost Guard: Company F, 100th Ohio: Lt John P. Denny	2nd Brigade Bvt BG John S. Casement	65th Illinois: Ltc William S. Stewart; 65th Indiana: Ltc John W. Hammond; 9th New Jersey: Col James Stewart Jr.; 103rd Ohio: Cpt Henry S. Pickands; 177th Ohio: Ltc William H. Zimmerman
Third Division; BG James W. Reilly; BG Samuel P. Carter; Provost Guard: Company F, 100th Ohio: Lt John P. Denny	3rd Brigade Bvt BG Thomas J. Henderson	112th Illinois: Ltc Emery S. Bond; 63rd Indiana: Ltc Daniel Morris, Maj Frank Wilcox; 140th Indiana: Col Thomas J. Brady; 17th Massachusetts: Ltc Henry Splaine
Third Division; BG James W. Reilly; BG Samuel P. Carter; Provost Guard: Company F, 100th Ohio: Lt John P. Denny	Artillery	Battery D, 1st Ohio: Cpt Giles J. Cockerill, Lt Cecil C. Reed
Third Division - Cavalry; Bvt MG Hugh Judson Kilpatrick	1st Brigade Bvt BG Thomas J. Jordan	8th Indiana Cavalry (& 3rd Indiana Cavalry, one battalion): Ltc Fielder A. Jones; 2nd Kentucky Cavalry: Maj Owen Star; 3rd Kentucky Cavalry: Ltc Robert H. King; 9th Pennsylvania Cavalry: Ltc David H. Kimmel
Third Division - Cavalry; Bvt MG Hugh Judson Kilpatrick	2nd Brigade Bvt BG Smith D. Atkins	92nd Illinois Mounted Infantry: Ltc Matthew Van Buskirk; 9th Michigan Cavalry: Col George S. Acker; 9th Ohio Cavalry: Col William D. Hamilton; 10th Ohio Cavalry: Col Thomas W. Sanderson; McLaughlin's Squadron (Ohio): Cpt John Dalzell
Third Division - Cavalry; Bvt MG Hugh Judson Kilpatrick	3rd Brigade Col Michael Kerwin; Bvt BG Thomas T. Heath	1st Alabama Cavalry: Maj Sanford Tramel; 5th Ohio Cavalry: Maj George H. Rader; 13th Pennsylvania Cavalry: Maj George F. McCabe, Col Michael Kerwin
Third Division - Cavalry; Bvt MG Hugh Judson Kilpatrick	Artillery	23rd New York Battery: Cpt Samuel Kittinger

== See also ==
- North Carolina in the American Civil War
- South Carolina in the American Civil War
