= Blackland, Mississippi =

Unincorporated community in Mississippi, USA)

- Unincorporated community
- Location within Mississippi Location within the United States
- Coordinates: 34°38′24″N 88°39′57″W
- Country: United States
- State: Mississippi
- County: Prentiss
- Elevation: 436 ft (133 m)
- Time zone: UTC-6 (Central (CST))
  - Summer (DST): UTC-5 (CDT)
- Area code: 662
- GNIS feature ID: 667247

Blackland is an unincorporated community in Prentiss County, Mississippi, United States.

One of the earliest settlers in Blackland was Joshua Bowdry from Kentucky, who settled in the area in 1844. He named the community Blackland after the area's rich soil, which makes up the Blackland Prairie ecoregion.

In 1900, Blackland had a population of 25.

Blackland School opened in 1857. In 1956, the school served Grades 1–8.

The Blackland Methodist Church was founded in 1857. In 1933, the building was dismantled and moved 100 yards south to its present location. In 2015, it was purchased by a local family and converted into a community center.

A post office operated under the name Blackland from 1884 to 1905.

On June 4, 1862, a skirmish was fought in Blackland prior to the Battle of Booneville. The 1st Alabama Cavalry Regiment participated in this skirmish.
