= David Linton =

David Linton may refer to:

- David Linton (geographer) (1906–1971), British geographer
- David Linton (politician) (1815–1889), American politician from Ohio
