= James George Smith =

American fraternity founder (1819–1849)

- Born: August 20, 1819; Waynesville, Ohio, US
- Died: September 16, 1849 (aged 30); Warren, Ohio, US
- Burial place: Miami Cemetery. Corwin, Ohio, US
- Education: Miami University
- Occupation: Farmer
- Known for: Founders of Beta Theta Pi

James George Smith (August 20, 1819 – September 16, 1849) was one of eight founders of Beta Theta Pi, a prominent college fraternity founded at Miami University in 1839.

== Early life ==
Smith was born in Waynesville, Ohio on August 20, 1819. His parents were Mary (née Whitehill) and Thomas Edward Smith.

He attended Miami University in Oxford, Ohio, graduating with an A.B. degree in 1840. While there, he was a member of the Union Literary Society. He was also one of eight founders of Beta Theta Pi in 1839 and served as the fraternity's first secretary. He was roommates with Samuel Taylor Marshall, another Beta Theta Pi founder, in the west wing Old Main.

== Career ==
After college, Smith was a farmer, living six miles east of Lebanon, Ohio.

== Personal life ==
Marshall described Smith as a "pale, studious, quiet fellow in delicate health". In 1841 and 1842, Smith went to Florida to treat his tuberculosis. He recovered and returned to Ohio.

Smith died on September 16, 1849, in Warren, Ohio, from dysentary, resulting from cholera. He was buried in the Smith family cemetery and reinterred in the Miami Cemetery at Corwin, Ohio in November 1867.

== See also ==
- List of Beta Theta Pi members
