= New York Rocket Battalion =

Rocket Battalion of Artillery (General Barry's)
- Active: December 5, 1861 to November 1, 1862
- Country: United States
- Allegiance: Union
- Branch: Artillery
- Equipment: Rocket artillery
- Engagements: Battle of New Bern

The Rocket Battalion of Artillery (General Barry's), better known as the New York Rocket Battalion was an artillery battalion organized in the state of New York for service in the Union Army during the American Civil War.

== History ==
The battalion was organized at Albany, December 5, 1861, and there mustered in the United States service for three years, December 6 and 7, 1861. The three companies recruited originally—Ransom's, Lee's and Sauer's—were consolidated into two companies on December 5 and the battalion, commanded by Maj. Thomas W. Lion, left the state on December 9.

It served at and near Washington, D. C., from December 1861, and in North Carolina, (2nd Brigade, 2nd Division, Dept. of North Carolina), from May 1862 until February 11, 1863, when the battalion organization was discontinued. The two companies, A and B, were designated the 23rd and 24th batteries of Light Artillery, having served provisionally as such from November 1, 1862. The loss and engagements of the battalion are included in the record of the batteries into which its two companies were converted.

== Rocket artillery ==
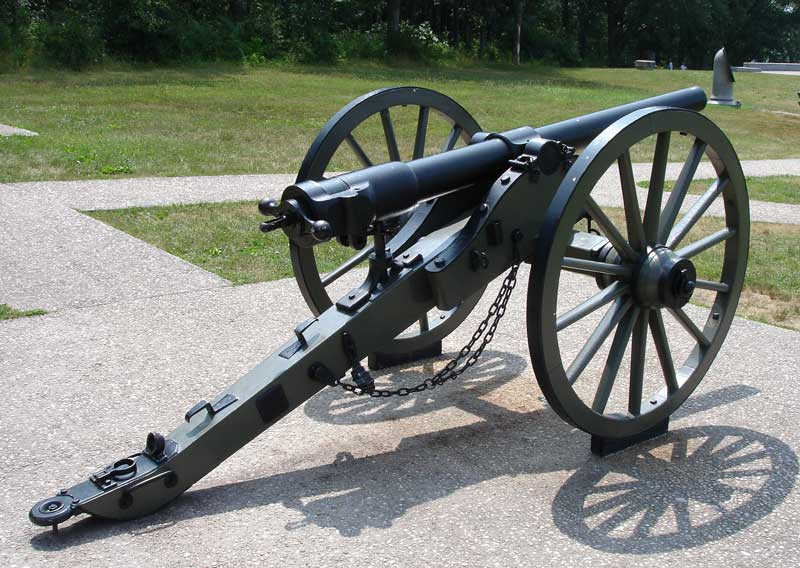
A British Whitworth rifled-breechloader, not unlike the breechloading guns used by the Rocket Battalion.

During its months of service, the Rocket Battalion used eight breechloading cannon designed to fire Hale rockets. These were developed by Major Lions himself, and presented to President Lincoln shortly after the Battle of Bull Run in July 1861. They proved very unreliable during tests and in combat, so after the battalion was disbanded, each battery received regular M1857 12-pounder Napoleon's instead.

== Service ==
- Battle of New Bern, March 14, 1862.
- Garrison duty at New Bern and Morehead City, North Carolina, until December, 1862.
- Reconnaissance from New Bern to Young's Cross Roads July 26–29.
- Action at Young's Cross Roads July 27.
- Battalion discontinued November 1, 1862, and Company "A" designated 23rd Independent Battery New York Light Artillery. Company "B" designated 24th Independent Battery New York Light Artillery.

== See also ==
- List of New York Civil War units
- Field Artillery in the American Civil War
- Rocket artillery
