= Samuel Taylor Marshall =

American attorney and fraternity founder

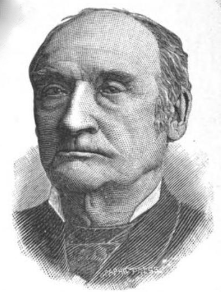
- Born: February 6, 1812; Oxford, Ohio, US
- Died: June 13, 1895 (aged 83); Keokuk, Iowa, US
- Burial place: Oakland Cemetery (Keokuk, Iowa)
- Education: Miami University
- Occupation: Attorney
- Known for: Founder of Beta Theta Pi

Samuel Taylor Marshall (February 6, 1812 – June 13, 1895) was an American attorney, government official, and fraternity founder. He was one of the founders of Beta Theta Pi, a college fraternity founded at Miami University in 1839. Marshall served as the sergeant-at-arms of the Iowa legislature.

== Early life ==
Marshall was born February 6, 1812, in Oxford, Ohio. His parents were Mary Hueston and Gilbert Marshall, a farmer. He was one of ten children and completed his primary education in local county schools.

Marshall attended Miami University, graduating with an A.B. degree in 1840. While at Miami, he was one of the eight founders of Beta Theta Pi fraternity. He wrote the fraternity's constitution and its by-laws. Initially, the group operated sub rose because of faculty objections to Greek letter organizations. However, once Marshall had recruited ten members, they wore a fraternity pin in public. As the oldest member of the fraternity, he was regarded as its "father".

Marshall joined the Patriots and fought in the Patriot War as a Lieutenant Colonel. He was captured by the Canadians and imprisoned from July 1841 to February 1842. When he was captured, he ate the official documents in his possession, rather than letting them be seen by the Canadians. He was found guilty of invasion and was sentenced to transportation to Van Diemen's Land, now Tasmania, but managed to elude deportation until he was released.

After his release, Marshall studied law with Timonty Walker in Cincinnati. He then continued his law studies in LaFayette, Indiana and with Pettit & Orth.

== Career ==
Marshall moved to Lee County, Iowa in December 1842 and began practicing law in West Point. The governor appointed Marshall as a notary public for Lee County in 1844. In 1847, Marshall moved his practice to Keokuk, Iowa where he became a prominent attorney. He served as the sergeant-at-arms of the Iowa legislature from 1846 to 1848.

Marshall was an editor of the Nip and Tuck, a daily newspaper in Keokuk.

== Honors ==
Marshall was the guest of honor for the Beta Theta Pi Founders' Day celebration on May 24, 1895. In 1898, the fraternity erected a memorial to Marshall and its other founders at Miami University. Beta Theta Pi named its Samuel Tayor Marshall Memorial Scholarship in his honor.

== Personal life ==
Marshall married Louisa Davis Patterson, a native of Kentucky, in West Point on February 26, 1846. She was the daughter of Col. William Patterson who was a member of Iowa's first territorial legislature and was the mayor and postmaster of Keokuk. The couple had ten children, including Robert M. Marshall, W. P. Marshall, A. Tom Marshall, Sabret T. Mashall, C. H. Marshall, Maude M. Marshall, and Sabet T. Marshall. Tom practice law with his father and Robert became the county attorney of Lee County. Sabret studied law under his father and brother and became a lawyer and member of the Iowa legislature.

In October 1945, Marshall was a member of the Anti-Morman League in Lee County; he served on a committee to select candidates for office. He was also a member of the Masons.

On June 13, 1895, Marshall died of heart problems in Keokuk at the age of 85 years. He was buried in the Oakland Cemetery in Keokuk. Beta Theta Pi held a memorial service for Marshall at its annual convention in Chicago on July 26, 1895.

His daughter, Maude, bequeathed $5,000 ($60,093 in today's money) to the Miami University chapter of Beta Theta Pi in 1955.

== See also ==
- List of Beta Theta Pi members
