= Notary public (United States) =

American state government position

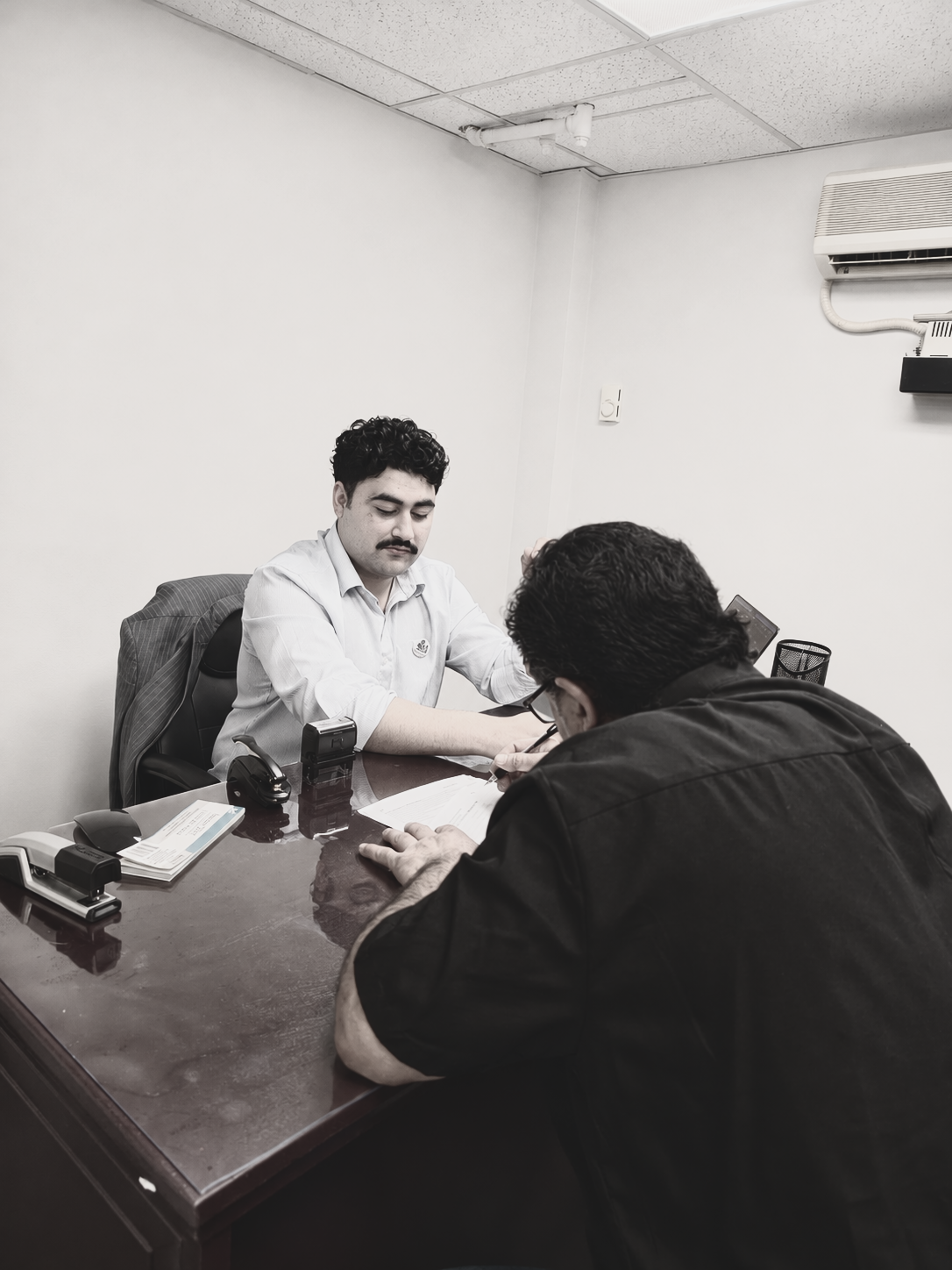
A notary public assisting a person with a document signing.

In the United States, a notary public is a person appointed by a state government, e.g., the governor, lieutenant governor, secretary of state, or in some cases the state legislature, and whose primary role is to serve the public as an impartial witness when important documents are signed. Since the notary is a state officer, a notary's duties may vary widely from state to state and in most cases, a notary is barred from acting outside their home state unless the notary has a commission there as well or the states have a reciprocity agreement.

== Overview ==
In 32 states, the main requirements are to fill out a form and pay a fee; many states have restrictions concerning notaries with criminal histories, but the requirements vary from state to state. Notaries in 18 states and the District of Columbia are required to take a course, pass an exam, or both; the education or exam requirements in Delaware, Iowa, and Kansas apply only to notaries who will perform electronic notarizations.

A notary is almost always permitted to notarize a document anywhere in the state where their commission is issued. Some states simply issue a commission "at large," meaning no indication is made as to what county the person's commission was issued from, but some states do require the notary to include the county of issue of their commission as part of the jurat, or, where seals are required, to indicate the county of issue of their commission on the seal. If a state requires indicating the county where the commission was issued, it does not necessarily mean that the notary is restricted to notarizing documents in that county, although some states may impose this as a requirement.

Some states (Montana, Wyoming, and North Dakota, among others) allow a notary who is commissioned in a state bordering that state to also act as a notary in the state if the other state allows the same. Thus, someone who was commissioned in Montana could notarize documents in Wyoming and North Dakota, and a notary commissioned in Wyoming could notarize documents in Montana. However, a notary from Wyoming could not notarize documents from North Dakota (or the inverse) unless they had a commission from North Dakota or a state bordering North Dakota that also allowed North Dakota notaries to practice in that state.

Notaries in the United States are much less closely regulated than notaries in most other common-law countries, typically because U.S. notaries have little legal authority. In the United States, a lay notary may not offer legal advice or prepare documents – except in Louisiana and Puerto Rico – and in most cases cannot recommend how a person should sign a document or what type of notarization is necessary. There are some exceptions; for example, Florida notaries may take affidavits, draft inventories of safe deposit boxes, draft protests for payment of dishonored checks and promissory notes, and solemnize marriages. In most states, a notary can also certify or attest a copy or facsimile.

The most common notarial acts in the United States are the taking of acknowledgements and oaths. Many professions may require a person to double as a notary public, which is why US court reporters are often notaries, as this enables them to swear in witnesses (deponents) when they are taking depositions; secretaries, bankers, and some lawyers are commonly notaries public. Despite their limited role, some American notaries may also perform a number of far-ranging acts not generally found anywhere else. Depending on the jurisdiction, they may: take depositions, certify any and all petitions (ME), witness third-party absentee ballots (ME), provide no-impediment marriage licenses, solemnize civil marriages (ME, FL, SC, MT, & AL (as of August 2019)), witness the opening of a safe deposit box or safe and take an official inventory of its contents, take a renunciation of dower or inheritance (SC), and so on.

=== Acknowledgment ===
"An acknowledgment is a formal [oral] declaration before an authorized public officer. It is made by a person executing [signing] an instrument who states that it was his [or her] free act and deed." That is, the person signed it without undue influence and for the purposes detailed in it. A certificate of acknowledgment is a written statement signed (and in some jurisdictions, sealed) by the notary or other authorized official that serves to prove that the acknowledgment occurred. The form of the certificate varies from jurisdiction to jurisdiction, but will be similar to the following:

Before me, the undersigned authority, on this ______ day of ___________, 20__ personally appeared _________________________, to me well known to be the person who executed the foregoing instrument, and he/she acknowledged before me that he/she executed the same as his/her voluntary act and deed.

=== Oath, affirmation, and jurat ===
A jurat is the official written statement by a notary public that he or she has administered and witnessed an oath or affirmation for an oath of office, or on an affidavit; that is, that a person has sworn to or affirmed the truth of information contained in a document under penalty of perjury, whether that document is a lengthy deposition or a simple statement on an application form. The simplest form of jurat and the oath or affirmation administered by a notary are:

- Jurat: "Sworn (or affirmed) to before me this _______ day of ____________, 20__."
- Oath: "Do you solemnly swear that the contents of this affidavit subscribed by you are correct and true?"
- Affirmation (for those opposed to swearing oaths): "Do you solemnly, sincerely, and truly declare and affirm that the statements made by you are true and correct?"

=== Venue ===
In the U.S., notarial acts normally include what is called a venue or caption; that is, an official listing of the place where a notarization occurred, usually in the form of the state and county and with the abbreviation "ss" (for Latin scilicet, "to wit") normally referred to as a "subscript", often in these forms:

State of .......)
                )ss:
County of.......)

State of ________
County of _______, to-wit:

The venue is usually set forth at the beginning of the instrument or at the top of the notary's certificate. If it is at the head of the document, it is usually referred to as a caption. In times gone by, the notary would indicate the street address at which the ceremony was performed, and this practice, though unusual today, is occasionally encountered.

== Jurisdictions ==
=== Federal ===
Apart from military officers (see below) there are no federal notaries. Federal law, however, provides for authentication in lieu of notarization in 28 U.S.C. 1746. That section provides that to meet any notarization requirement under federal law or practice, an unsworn declaration under penalties of perjury is sufficient. The declaration may be executed inside or outside the United States. The existence of the statute is not well known with the result that state notarizations are sought (or required) by federal officers who are unfamiliar with 28 U.S.C. 1746.

In addition, 22 U.S.C. 4221 authorizes "every secretary of embassy or legation and consular officer" to "perform any notarial act which any notary public is required or authorized by law to do within the United States" and also permits the Secretary of State to authorize overseas U.S. citizen government employees and contractors to do the same. It further declares these notarial acts valid as though they were administered before a Notary Public within the United States. U.S. embassies and consulates provide Notarial services for a fee to customers of all nationalities.

==== Military ====
Certain members of the United States Armed Forces are given the powers of a notary under federal law (10 U.S.C. section 1044a). Some military members have authority to certify documents or administer oaths, without being given all notarial powers. In addition to the powers granted by the federal government, some states have enacted laws granting notarial powers to commissioned officers.

=== By state ===
==== California ====
The California Secretary of State, Notary Public & Special Filings Section, is responsible for appointing and commissioning qualified persons as notaries public for four-year terms.

Prior to sitting for the notary exam, one must complete a mandatory six-hour course of study. This required course of study is conducted either in an online, home study, or in-person format via an approved notary education vendor. Both prospective notaries as well as current notaries seeking reappointment must undergo an expanded FBI and California Department of Justice background check.

Various statutes, rules, and regulations govern notaries public. California law sets maximum, but not minimum, fees for services related to notarial acts (e.g., per signature: acknowledgment $15, jurat $15, certified power of attorney $15, et cetera). A finger print (typically the right thumb) may be required in the notary journal based on the transaction in question (e.g., deed, quitclaim deed, deed of trust affecting real property, power of attorney document, et cetera). Documents with blank spaces cannot be notarized (a further anti-fraud measure). California law explicitly prohibits notaries public, who are not attorneys, from using literal foreign language translation of their title, unless accompanied by a disclaimer, in both the foreign language and in English, that the notary public is not an attorney and therefore cannot give legal advice. The use of a notary seal is required.

==== Colorado ====
Notarial acts performed in Colorado are governed under the Notaries Public Act, 12-55-101, et seq. Pursuant to that law, notaries are appointed by the secretary of state for a term not to exceed four years. Notaries may apply for appointment or reappointment online at the secretary of state's website. A notary may apply for reappointment to the notary office 90 days before the commission expires. Notaries are required to take a training course and pass an examination to ensure minimal competence under the Notaries Public Act. A course of instruction approved by the secretary of state may be administered by approved vendors and shall bear an emblem with a certification number assigned by the secretary of state's office. An approved course of instruction covers relevant provisions of the Colorado Notaries Public Act, the Model Notary Act, and widely accepted best practices. In addition to courses offered by approved vendors, the secretary of state offers free certification courses. A third party seeking to verify the status of a Colorado notary may do so by visiting the Secretary of State's website.

==== Connecticut ====
The Connecticut secretary of state appoints notaries for five-year commissions. The application process includes an examination, a review of the applicant's character, a jurat, and a sample of the applicant's handwriting. Attorneys licensed to practice in Connecticut have all of the powers of notaries and are authorized to do all acts that may be done by notaries.

==== Florida ====
Florida notaries public are appointed by the governor to serve a four-year term. New applicants and commissioned notary public must be bona fide residents of the state of Florida and first time applicants must complete a mandatory three-hour education course administered by an approved educator. Florida state law also requires that a notary public post bond in the amount of $7,500.00. A bond is required in order to compensate an individual harmed as a result of a breach of duty by the notary. Applications are submitted and processed through an authorized bonding agency. Florida is one of three states (Maine and South Carolina are the others) where a notary public can solemnize the rites of matrimony (perform a marriage ceremony).

The Department of State appoints civil law notaries, also called "Florida International Notaries", who must be Florida attorneys who have practiced law for five or more years. Applicants must attend a seminar and pass an exam administered by the Department of State or any private vendor approved by the department. Such civil law notaries are appointed for life and may perform all of the acts of a notary public in addition to preparing authentic acts.

==== Illinois ====
Notaries public in Illinois are appointed by the secretary of state to four-year terms if they live in the state; residents of a state bordering Illinois (Iowa, Indiana, Kentucky, Missouri, Wisconsin) who work or have a place of business in Illinois can be appointed for a one-year term. Notaries must be United States citizens (though the requirement that a notary public must be a United States citizen is unconstitutional; see Bernal v. Fainter), or aliens lawfully admitted for permanent residence; be able to read and write the English language; be residents of (or employed within) the state of Illinois for at least 30 days; be at least 18 years old; not be convicted of a felony; and not had a notary commission revoked or suspended during the past 10 years.

An applicant for the notary public commission must also post a $5,000 bond and pay an application fee of $10. The application is usually accompanied with an oath of office. If the application is approved, the secretary of state sends the commission to the clerk of the county where the applicant resides. If the applicant records the commission with the county clerk, he or she then receives the commission. Illinois law prohibits notaries from using the literal Spanish translation in their title and requires them to use a rubber stamp seal for their notarizations. The notary public can then perform his or her duties anywhere in the state, as long as the notary resides (or works or does business) in the county where he or she was appointed.

==== Kentucky ====
A notary public in Kentucky is a public servant appointed by the secretary of state under section 432.390 of the Kentucky Revised Statutes (KRS) to administer oaths and take proof of execution and acknowledgements of instruments. Notaries public fulfill their duties to deter fraud and ensure proper execution. A notary is commissioned to perform notarial acts anywhere within the physical borders of the Commonwealth of Kentucky that may be recorded in any state, regardless of the county of application (state-at-large).

To be commissioned as a notary public, an applicant must be at least eighteen years of age, a citizen or permanent legal resident of the United States, be a resident of or have a place of employment or practice in the Kentucky county where the application is made, be able to read and write English and not disqualified under KRS 423.395. A completed application is sent to the secretary of state's office with the required ten dollar ($10) fee. Once the application is approved, the notary's commission is sent to the county clerk in the county of application and a notice of appointment is sent to the applicant. The applicant will have thirty days to go to the county clerk's office where they will be required to 1.) post a $1,000 surety bond, 2.) take and subscribe to the oath/affirmation of office, and 3.) file and record the commission with the county clerk.

In addition to notaries public, the elected county clerk of each county shall have the powers of a notarial officer in the exercise of the official functions of the office of clerk within their county. Also, actions of a county clerk in their official capacity shall not require the witness or signature of a notary public.

A Kentucky notary public is not required to use a stamp as the signature and title of the notary, along with the notary's commission number and commission expiration date, is considered to be a valid notarial act. If an official stamp is used, it is required to have the name of the notary as listed on their commission, their full title of office and jurisdiction, their commission number and commission expiration date. The stamp must also be able to be copied together with the record to which it is affixed or attached or with which it is logically associated. Stamps must be rendered unusable upon the expiration of the notary's commission or upon the notary's death, resignation or removal from office.

A notary public, if authorized by the secretary of state to conduct electronic notarization, must maintain a journal of all electronic notarization. This journal must be in an electronic format and must be maintained by the notary or a designated custodian for ten (10) years after the performance of the last electronic notarization. A well-bound and indexed journal is also required when recording protests. For other notarial acts, a journal is not required but is recommended.

==== Louisiana ====
Louisiana notaries public are commissioned by the governor with the advice and consent of the state senate. They are the only U.S. notaries to be appointed for life. A commissioned notary in Louisiana is a civil law notary that can perform/prepare many civil law notarial acts usually associated with attorneys and other legally authorized practitioners in other states, except represent another person or entity before a court of law for a fee (unless they are also admitted to the state bar). Notaries are not allowed to give "legal" advice, but they are allowed to give "notarial" advice, i.e., explain or recommend what documents are needed or required to perform a certain act, and do all things necessary or incidental to the performance of their civil law notarial duties. They can prepare inventories, appraisements, partitions, wills, protests, matrimonial contracts, conveyances, and, generally, all contracts and instruments of writing, hold family meetings and meetings of creditors, receive acknowledgments, make affidavits of correction, affix and raise the seals on the effects of a deceased person, and administer oaths. If ordered or requested by a judge, they may prepare certain notarial legal documents, in accordance with law, to be returned and filed with that court of law.

==== Maine ====
Maine notaries public are appointed by the secretary of state to serve a seven-year term. Between 1981 and 1988, the offices of justice of the peace and notary public were merged, and all duties formerly performed by justices of the peace were transferred to notaries public. Because of this, Maine is one of three states (Florida and South Carolina are the others) where a notary public is authorized to perform marriages. (Maine still has an office called justice of the peace, created in 1989, to receive complaints and perform certain other acts defined by statute.)

Attorneys licensed to practice in Maine have all of the powers of notaries and are authorized to do all acts that may be done by notaries.

==== Maryland ====
Maryland notaries public are appointed by the governor, on the recommendation of a state senator, to serve a four-year term. New applicants and commissioned notaries public must be bona fide residents of the State of Maryland or work in the state. The official document of appointment is imprinted with the signatures of the governor and the secretary of state as well as the Great Seal of Maryland. Before exercising the duties of a notary public, an appointee must appear before the clerk of one of Maryland's 24 circuit courts to take an oath of office.

A bond is not required. A notary is required to keep a log of all notarial acts, indicating the name of the person, their address, what type of document is being notarized, the type of ID used to authenticate them (or that they are known personally) by the notary, and the person's signature. The notary's log is the only document for which a notary may write their own certificate.

==== Massachusetts ====
In Massachusetts, Notaries Public are judicial officers that are appointed by the Governor with the advice and consent of the Governor's Council and are tasked with performing notarial acts such as acknowledgments, oaths and affirmations, jurats, signature witnessings, copy certifications, issuing summonses for witnesses, issuing subpoenas, and witnessing the opening of a bank safe, vault or box.

To become a Notary in Massachusetts, one must submit a form to the Governor's Office with the signature of an attorney and three other members of your community attesting to your character and qualifications. If your application is decided on favorably by the Governor and the Governor's Council, you must take your Oath of Office before two Commissioners to Qualify Public Officers.

==== Michigan ====
Michigan notaries public are commissioned by the secretary of state. A notary public's term of office expires on their date of birth no less than six years nor more than seven years after their date of appointment. In order to be appointed, an applicant must file a surety bond of $10,000 and take an oath before the county clerk of the county in which they reside, or if not a resident of Michigan, where they maintain their principal place of work.

Michigan notaries public are authorized to take acknowledgments, administer oaths or affirmations, and witness or attest to signatures anywhere in the state.

Michigan notaries public are not required to maintain records, but if records are kept, they must be maintained for 5 years and be provided to the Department of State upon request. However, the law does not describe the type of record that must be kept or what must be included in a record. In 2018 and 2019, the state passed laws that allow for electronic and remote notarization in Michigan, once electronic notarization platforms are approved. As of November 2019 no such platforms have been given final approval, and as such, no Michigan notary public can perform electronic notarization as an e-notary public or remote notary public.

==== Minnesota ====
Minnesota notaries public are commissioned by the governor with the advice and consent of the senate for a five-year term. All commissions expire on January 31 of the fifth year following the year of issue. Citizens and resident aliens over the age of 18 years apply to the secretary of state for appointment and reappointment. Residents of adjoining counties in adjoining states may also apply for a notary commission in Minnesota. Notaries public have the power to administer all oaths required or authorized to be administered in the state; take and certify all depositions to be used in any of the courts of the state; take and certify all acknowledgments of deeds, mortgages, liens, powers of attorney and other instruments in writing or electronic records; and receive, make out and record notarial protests.

==== Montana ====
Montana notaries public are appointed by the secretary of state and serve a four-year term. A Montana notary public has jurisdiction throughout the states of Montana, North Dakota, and Wyoming through reciprocity.

==== Nevada ====
The secretary of state is charged with the responsibility of appointing notaries by the provisions of Chapter 240 of the Nevada Revised Statutes. Nevada notaries public who are not also practicing attorneys are prohibited by law from using "notario", "notario publico" or any non-English term to describe their services. (2005 Changes to NRS 240)

Nevada notary duties: administer oaths or affirmations; take acknowledgments; use of subscribing witness; certify copies; and execute jurats or take a verification upon oath or affirmation.

==== New Jersey ====
Notaries are commissioned by the state treasurer for a period of five years. Notaries must also be sworn in by the clerk of the county in which he or she resides. One can become a notary in the state of New Jersey if he or she: (1) is over the age of 18; (2) is a resident of New Jersey or is regularly employed in New Jersey and lives in an adjoining state; (3) has never been convicted of a crime under the laws of any state or the United States, for an offense involving dishonesty, or a crime of the first or second degree, unless the person has met the requirements of the Rehabilitated Convicted Offenders Act (NJSA 2A:168-1). Notary applications must be endorsed by a state legislator.

Notaries in the state of New Jersey serve as impartial witnesses to the signing of documents, attests to the signature on the document, and may also administer oaths and affirmations. Seals are not required; many people prefer them and as a result, most notaries have seals in addition to stamps. Notaries may administer oaths and affirmations to public officials and officers of various organizations. They may also administer oaths and affirmations in order to execute jurats for affidavits/verifications, and to swear in witnesses.

Notaries are prohibited from pre-dating actions; lending notary equipment to someone else (such as stamps, seals, and journals); preparing legal documents or giving legal advice; appearing as a representative of another person in a legal proceeding. Notaries should also refrain from notarizing documents in which they have a personal interest.

Pursuant to state law, attorneys licensed in New Jersey may administer oaths and affirmations.

==== New York ====
New York notaries are empowered to administer oaths and affirmations (including oaths of office), to take affidavits and depositions, to receive and certify acknowledgments or proof of deeds, mortgages and powers of attorney and other instruments in writing; to demand acceptance or payment of foreign and inland bills of exchange, promissory notes and obligations in writing, and to protest these (that is, certify them) for non-acceptance or non-payment. They are not empowered to marry couples, their notarization of a will is insufficient to give the will legal force, and they are strictly forbidden to certify "true copies" of documents. Every county clerk's office in New York must have a notary public available to serve the public free of charge.

Admitted attorneys are automatically eligible to be notaries in the State of New York, but must make an application through the proper channels and pay a fee.

New York notaries initially must pass a test and then renew their status every 4 years.

==== Oregon ====
Oregon notaries public are appointed by the governor and commissioned by the Oregon Secretary of State to serve a four-year term. Oregon notaries are empowered to administer oaths, jurats and affirmations (including oaths of office), to take affidavits and depositions, to receive and certify acknowledgments or proof of deeds, mortgages and powers of attorney and other instruments in writing; to demand acceptance or payment of foreign and inland bills of exchange, promissory notes and obligations in writing, and to protest these (that is, certify them) for non-acceptance or non-payment. They are also empowered to certify "true copies" of most documents. Every court clerk in Oregon is also empowered to act as a notary public, although they are not required to keep a journal. Oregon formerly required that impression seals be used, but now it is optional. Beginning in 2001, all Oregon notaries were required to pass an open-book examination to receive their commission. Beginning in 2006, new notary applicants were also required to complete a free three-hour online or live in-person instructional seminar, however this requirement is waived for notaries who are renewing their commissions, as long as the commission is renewed before its expiration date. Oregon law specifically prohibits the use of the term "notario publico" by a notary in advertising his or her services, but translation of the title into other languages is not restricted.

==== Pennsylvania ====
A notary in the Commonwealth of Pennsylvania is empowered to perform seven distinct official acts: take affidavits, verifications, acknowledgments and depositions, certify copies of documents, administer oaths and affirmations, and protest dishonored negotiable instruments. A notary is strictly prohibited from giving legal advice or drafting legal documents such as contracts, mortgages, leases, wills, powers of attorney, liens or bonds.

==== South Carolina ====
South Carolina notaries public are appointed by the governor to serve a ten-year term. All applicants must first have that application endorsed by a state legislator before submitting their application to the secretary of state. South Carolina is one of three states (Florida and Maine are the others) where a notary public can perform a marriage ceremony. Residents of the state who work in North Carolina, Georgia or Washington, DC are eligible to become notaries in those jurisdictions, but that provision is not available to out-of-state residents that work in South Carolina.

==== Texas ====
Texas Government Code Section 406 governs notaries public.

The Texas Secretary of State handles appointments of notaries public. Any person appointed serves for four years and has statewide jurisdiction. A person must be at least 18 and not convicted of a felony or a crime involving "moral turpitude", must complete all forms and pay all fees required, and must post a $10,000 bond. The notary public must, in any advertisement, list language substantially stating (in both English and, if applicable, the language in which the advertisement is transmitted): "I AM NOT AN ATTORNEY LICENSED TO PRACTICE LAW IN TEXAS AND MAY NOT GIVE LEGAL ADVICE OR ACCEPT FEES FOR LEGAL ADVICE." This is not required if the notary public is an attorney.

==== Utah ====
Utah notaries public are appointed by the lieutenant governor to serve a four-year term. While it was previously mandatory in Utah that impression seals be used, it is now optional. The seal must be in purple ink.

==== Virginia ====
A Virginia notary must either be a resident of Virginia or work in Virginia, and is authorized to acknowledge signatures, take oaths, and certify copies of non-government documents which are not otherwise available, e.g. a notary cannot certify a copy of a birth or death certificate since a certified copy of the document can be obtained from the issuing agency. Seals are not required, but if they are used they must be photographically reproducible. The notary's registration number must appear on any document notarized.

On July 1, 2012, Virginia became the first state to authorize a signer to be in a remote location and have a document notarized electronically by an approved Virginia electronic notary using audio-visual conference technology by passing the bills SB 827 and HB 2318.

==== Washington ====
In Washington, any resident or resident of an adjacent state employed in Washington may apply to become a notary public. Applicants must obtain a $10,000 surety bond and present proof at a Department of Licensing office. A notary public is appointed for a term of 4 years.

==== Wyoming ====
Wyoming notaries public are appointed by the Secretary of State and serve a four-year term. A Wyoming notary public has jurisdiction throughout the states of Wyoming and Montana. These states permit notaries from neighboring states to act in the state in the same manner as one from that state under reciprocity, e.g. as long as that state grants notaries from neighboring states to act in their state.

== Controversies ==
A Maryland requirement that to obtain a commission, a notary declare a belief in God, as required by the Maryland Constitution, was found by the United States Supreme Court in Torcaso v. Watkins, 367 U.S. 488 (1961) to be unconstitutional. Historically, some states required that a notary be a citizen of the United States. However, the U.S. Supreme Court, in the case of Bernal v. Fainter 467 U.S. 216 (1984), declared that to be impermissible.

In the U.S., there are reports of notaries (or people claiming to be notaries) having taken advantage of the differing roles of notaries in common law and civil law jurisdictions to engage in the unauthorized practice of law. The victims of such scams are typically illegal immigrants from civil law countries who need assistance with, for example, their immigration papers and want to avoid hiring an attorney. Confusion often results from the mistaken premise that a notary public in the United States serves the same function as a notario publico in Spanish-speaking countries (which are civil law countries).
