= Michael C. Ryan =

American attorney and fraternity founder

- Born: Michael Clarkson Ryan; April 23, 1820; Lancaster, Pennsylvania, US
- Died: October 23, 1861 (aged 41); Hamilton, Ohio, US
- Burial place: Greenwood Cemetery (Hamilton, Ohio)
- Education: Miami University, A.B 1839, A.M. 1845; Cincinnati Law School, LL.B. 1842
- Occupation: Lawyer
- Known for: Founder of Beta Theta Pi

Michael Clarkson Ryan (April 23, 1820 – October 23, 1861) was an American attorney, politician, newspaper editor, and a founder of Beta Theta Pi. Ryan also organized and was the colonel of the 50th Ohio Infantry during the American Civil War.

== Early life ==
Ryan was born in Lancaster, Pennsylvania on April 23, 1820. He was raised in the Roman Catholic faith. His family moved to Hamilton, Ohio in 1832.

He attended Miami University, receiving an A.B. in 1839. While at Miami, he was one of eight founders of Beta Theta Pi fraternity on August 8, 1839. He then attended the Cincinnati Law School where he received an LL.B. in 1842. He received an A.M. From Miami University in 1845.

== Career ==
Ryant began to practice law in Hamilton. His law partner was John B. Weller, his brother-in-law and a future U.S. Congressman, Senator and California governor until the two dissolved their partnership on February 6, 1861. Ryan was prosecuting attorney of Butler County, Ohio from 1848 to 1852. He was the clerk of the county courts from 1852 to 1858.From 1847 to 1849, he was the editor and publisher of the Hamilton Telegraph.

In July 1850, Ryan was an assistant secretary for the Ohio Democratic State Convention. In January 1853, he represented the 3rd Congressional District at the Democratic State Convention. Ryan was a representative to the National Democratic Convention in 1856. He was appointed the clerk of the U.S. Fund Commission, responsible for distributing surplus revenue to the states. In February 1860, he was appointed to committee to oversee routes and safety issues related to the Great Miami Railroad on behalf of Hamilton.

In August 1861, the U.S. War Department authorized Ryan to organize an "Irish Regiment". Ryan played a key role in organizing the 50th Ohio Infantry which only included men of Irish descent. He was appointed by Governor William J. Dennison Jr. to serve as the regiment's Colonel. However, he died before the regiment saw action.

== Personal life ==
Ryan was married to Emily Leffler on November 16, 1845, in Butler County, Ohio. He died on October 23, 1861 in Hamilton, Ohio. He was buried in Greenwood Cemetery in Hamilton.

== See also ==
- List of Beta Theta Pi members
