= 99th Ohio Infantry Regiment =

- Active: August 26, 1862, to December 31, 1864
- Country: United States
- Allegiance: Union
- Branch: Infantry
- Engagements: Defense of Cincinnati; Battle of Perryville; Battle of Stones River; Tullahoma Campaign; Battle of Chickamauga; Siege of Chattanooga; Battle of Lookout Mountain; Battle of Missionary Ridge; Atlanta Campaign; Battle of Resaca; Battle of Kennesaw Mountain; Siege of Atlanta; Battle of Jonesboro; Second Battle of Franklin; Battle of Nashville

The 99th Ohio Infantry Regiment, sometimes 99th Ohio Volunteer Infantry (or 99th OVI) was an infantry regiment in the Union Army during the American Civil War.

== Service ==
The 99th Ohio Infantry was organized at Camp Lima in Allen County, Ohio and mustered in for three years service on August 26, 1862, under the command of Colonel Albert Longworthy. The regiment was recruited in Allen, Auglaize, Hancock, Mercer, Putnam, Shelby, and Van Wert counties.

The regiment was attached to 23rd Brigade, 5th Division, Army of the Ohio, September 1862. 23rd Brigade, 5th Division, II Corps, Army of the Ohio, to November 1862. 3rd Brigade, 3rd Division, Left Wing, XIV Corps, Army of the Cumberland, to January 1863. 3rd Brigade, 3rd Division, XXI Corps, Army of the Cumberland, to October 1863. 2nd Brigade, 1st Division, IV Corps, Army of the Cumberland, to June 1864. 2nd Brigade, 1st Division, XXIII Corps, Army of the Ohio, June 1864. 4th Brigade, 2nd Division, XXIII Corps, to August 1864. 1st Brigade, 2nd Division, XXIII Corps, to December 1864.

The 99th Ohio Infantry ceased to exist on December 31, 1864, when it was consolidated with the 50th Ohio Infantry.

== Detailed service ==
Ordered to Lexington, Ky., August 31, thence moved to Cynthiana, Ky., September 3, thence to Covington, Ky., and to Louisville, Ky., September 17. Pursuit of Bragg into Kentucky October 1–15. Battle of Perryville, Ky., October 8 (reserve). March to Nashville, Tenn., October 16-November 7, and duty there until December 26. Advance on Murfreesboro, Tenn., December 26–30. Battle of Stones River December 30–31, 1862 and January 1–3, 1863. Duty at Murfreesboro until June. Tullahoma Campaign June 23-July 7. March to McMinnville, and duty there until August 16. Passage of the Cumberland Mountains and Tennessee River and Chickamauga Campaign August 16-September 22. Battle of Chickamauga September 19–20. Siege of Chattanooga September 24-November 23. Reopening Tennessee River October 26–29. Chattanooga-Ringgold Campaign November 23–27. Orchard Knob November 23. Lookout Mountain November 23–24. Missionary Ridge November 25. Pigeon Hills November 26. Ringgold Gap, Taylor's Ridge, November 27. Camp at Shellmound until February, 1864. Demonstration on Dalton, Ga., February 22–27. Tunnel Hill, Buzzard's Roost Gap, and Rocky Faced Ridge February 23–25. At Cleveland until May. Atlanta Campaign May 1-September 8. Tunnel Hill May 6–7. Demonstration on Rocky Raced Ridge May 8–11. Buzzard's Roost Gap May 8–9. Demonstrations on Dalton May 9–13. Battle of Resaca May 14–15. Near Kingston May 18–19. Near Cassville May 19. Advance on Dallas May 22–25. Operations on line of Pumpkin Vine Creek and battles about Dallas, New Hope Church and Allatoona Hills May 25-June 5. Operations about Marietta and against Kennesaw Mountain June 10-July 2. Pine Hill June 11–14. Lost Mountain June 15–17. Muddy Creek June 17. Noyes Creek June 19. Kolb's Farm June 22. Assault on Kennesaw June 27. Nickajack Creek July 2–5. Ruff's Mills July 3–4. Chattahoochie River July 5–17. Decatur July 19. Siege of Atlanta July 22-August 25. Utoy Creek August 5–7. Flank movement on Jonesboro August 25–30. Battle of Jonesboro August 31-September 1. Lovejoy's Station September 2–6. Pursuit of Hood into Alabama October 3–26. Nashville Campaign November–December. Columbia, Duck River, November 24–27. Battle of Franklin November 30. Battle of Nashville December 15–16. Pursuit of Hood to the Tennessee River December 17–28.

== Casualties ==
The regiment lost a total of 342 men during service; 4 officers and 80 enlisted men killed or mortally wounded, 2 officers and 256 enlisted men died of disease.

== Commanders ==
- Colonel Albert Longworthy
- Colonel Peter T. Swaine
- Lieutenant Colonel John E. Cummins - commanded at the battles of Perryville, Stones River, and Nashville

== See also ==
- List of Ohio Civil War units
- Ohio in the Civil War
