= James Holt Clanton =

American lawyer

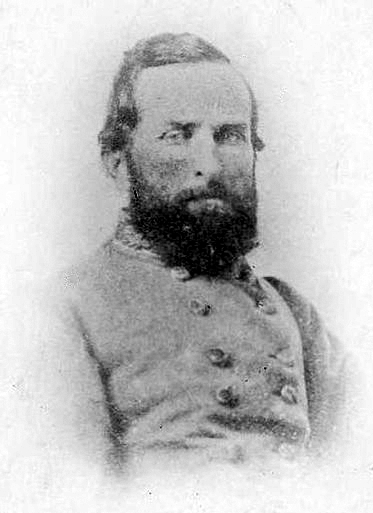
- Brigadier General James Holt Clanton, CSA photo taken between 1863 and 1865
- Born: January 8, 1827; Columbia County, Georgia
- Died: August 27, 1871 (aged 44); Knoxville, Tennessee
- Burial place: Oakwood Cemetery (Montgomery, Alabama)
- Military career
- Allegiance: United States; Confederate States of America
- Branch: United States Army; Confederate States Army
- Service years: 1846–47 (USA); 1861–65 (CSA)
- Rank: Private (USA); Brigadier General (CSA)
- Conflicts: Mexican–American War; American Civil War

James Holt Clanton (January 8, 1827 – September 27, 1871) was an American soldier, lawyer, legislator, and was later also a Confederate soldier. He enlisted in the United States Army for service during the Mexican–American War, and later was a Confederate Army brigadier general during the American Civil War. Following the war he returned to practicing law and later was murdered in a private feud in Tennessee.

== Early life and career ==
Clanton was born in 1827 in Columbia County, Georgia, a son of Nathaniel Holt Clanton. In 1835 the family relocated to Macon County, Alabama, where Clanton was raised and educated. Later he attended the University of Alabama located in Tuscaloosa, but he did not graduate. Clanton chose instead to join the U.S. Army and participate in the war with Mexico.

In 1846, Clanton first enlisted for six months as a private in the company of Capt. Rush Elmore, which belonged to Col. Bailie Peyton's regiment. When that term expired, Clanton joined the company of Capt. Preston Brooks of the Palmetto Regiment. Clanton and his regiment reached Mexico City following the September 1847 battle and after the occupation there had ended he returned home to Alabama.

After the war, Clanton resumed studying law and in 1850 was admitted to Alabama's bar association, settling in Montgomery. Later, Clanton served in the state's legislature, and in 1860 he served as an elector on the U.S. Presidential ticket of John Bell and Edward Everett.

== American Civil War service ==
Although Clanton personally was opposed to secession, he chose to follow his home state and the Confederate cause in 1861. He first served along the Florida coast until the fall, when he was appointed a captain in the Alabama Cavalry on November 12. Soon after Clanton was given command of the 1st Alabama Cavalry regiment and was promoted to the rank of colonel on December 3.

Clanton's first major action was during the Battle of Shiloh on April 6–7, 1862, in which he was part of the leading Confederate units on the battle's first day. Clanton next fought in the battle near Farmington, Mississippi, on May 9, and then led a brigade during the Battle of Booneville on July 1, where he "drove the enemy from the field." Sometime in 1862 Clanton resigned from the army, but was later reappointed a colonel in the Confederate service. His next assignment was as an aide-de-camp to Alabama governor John G. Shorter, and later in the same capacity to Gen. Braxton Bragg. During the spring of 1863 Clanton raised three additional regiments of infantry. Beginning that September he was given command of the 2nd Brigade in the Confederate Gulf District, holding this post into early 1864.

1864 Atlanta campaign

Clanton was promoted to the rank of brigadier general on November 16, 1863. From February to June 1864 he served as aide-de-camp to Lt. Gen. Leonidas Polk, and then he led the cavalry brigade of the North District in the Confederate Department of Alabama and Eastern Mississippi, a unit often styled as "Clanton's Cavalry Brigade." Clanton fought during the 1864 Atlanta campaign, notably in the engagement on July 14 at the Ten Island Ford of the Coosa River against Union Maj. Gen. Lovell H. Rousseau. In this battle Clanton reportedly "lost his entire staff" and "His bravery made him well known by the generals of the Army of Tennessee."

On September 23, 1864, Clanton's command was shifted to the District of Central Alabama in the Confederate Department of Alabama, Mississippi, and Eastern Louisiana until that November. In January 1865 Clanton was appointed to command the Cavalry Brigade of the District of the Gulf within the same department. On March 25 he was badly wounded in the fighting at Bluff Springs in Florida. Clanton was hit in his abdomen and his back, and was captured there by Union soldiers. Clanton was paroled from Mobile, Alabama, on May 25 and allowed to go home to Alabama.

== Postbellum career and murder ==
Following his release, Clanton applied for and was granted a pardon by the U.S. Government effective November 4, 1865. In 1866 he resumed his career as a lawyer, and also was very active in Democratic politics in his state.

=== Nelson–Clanton shootout ===
In September 1871, Clanton travelled to Knoxville, Tennessee, to represent the State of Alabama in a court case against the Chattanooga and Alabama Railroad. Clanton, aware of the strong Union sentiment in East Tennessee during the Civil War, felt he was entering hostile territory, and became convinced that the railroad company was going to try and assassinate him. On the afternoon of September 27, after the court had adjourned, one of the railroad company's attorneys, Tomlinson Fort (a friend of Clanton), took Clanton on a tour of Knoxville.

As Clanton and Fort passed the Lamar House Hotel on Gay Street, they encountered attorney David M. Nelson (a son of prominent politician and judge Thomas A. R. Nelson), who had been drinking nearby in the St. Nicholas saloon. Their meeting grew hostile as Clanton suspected Nelson was insulting him, and he challenged Nelson to a duel, which Nelson accepted. Clanton drew a pistol and ordered Fort to step off space for the duel (which Fort refused to do, pointing out that Nelson was intoxicated), while Nelson ran back into the saloon and obtained a double-barreled shotgun. When Nelson reemerged, he fired two shots, one of which mortally wounded Clanton. Clanton fired one shot, which missed.

Nelson was arrested and charged with murder. At his highly publicized trial in April 1873, Nelson's defense team argued that Nelson had acted in self-defense, and portrayed Clanton as belligerent and prone to violent outbursts. The trial concluded on April 30, and the jury deliberated for just five minutes before voting to acquit Nelson. Newspapers across Alabama railed against the acquittal, calling the trial a farce.

== Legacy ==
The city of Clanton, Alabama was originally named Goose Pond, but the name was changed to honor Clanton in 1871.

== See also ==
- List of American Civil War generals (Confederate)
