= Beta Theta Pi =

North American collegiate fraternity

- ΒΘΠ
- Founded: August 8, 1839; 187 years ago Miami University (Oxford, Ohio)
- Type: Social
- Affiliation: NIC
- Status: Active
- Scope: International
- Pillars: Intellect, Responsible Conduct, Mutual Assistance, Integrity, and Trust
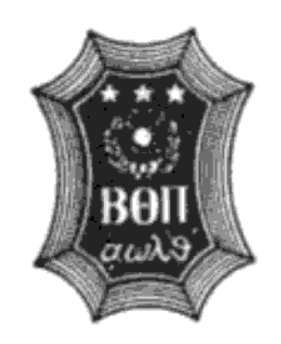
- Member badge
- Colors: Delicate shades of pink and blue
- Symbol: Dragon, Star, Diamond
- Flag
- Flower: Roses of the "June" or "Queen of the Prairie" variety
- Publication: The Beta Theta Pi
- Chapters: 150 active
- Members: 10,000+ active 223,000+ lifetime
- Headquarters: 5134 Bonham Road; Oxford, Ohio 45056; United States
- Website: beta.org

Beta Theta Pi (ΒΘΠ), commonly known as Beta, is a North American social fraternity that was founded in 1839 at Miami University in Oxford, Ohio. One of North America's oldest fraternities, as of August 2023, it consists of 150 active chapters and colonies in the United States and Canada. More than 223,000 members have been initiated worldwide and there are currently around 10,000 undergraduate members. Beta Theta Pi is the oldest of the three fraternities that formed the Miami Triad, along with Phi Delta Theta and Sigma Chi.

== History ==
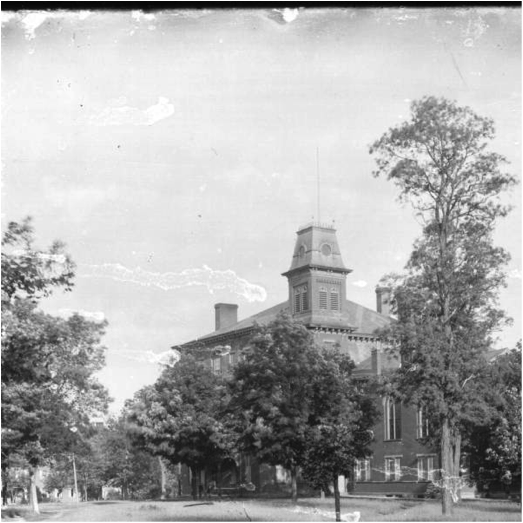
Harrison Hall (then known as Old Main) at Miami University, founding site of Beta Theta Pi, pictured about 1896

Students at Miami University at the time of Beta's founding had previously formed two rival literary societies: The Erodelphian and Union Literary Society. A student of the school, John Reily Knox, gathered members of both the Erodelphian and Union Literary Societies to create a new fraternity. In a letter that he wrote four years after the founding of the Alpha chapter, Knox said that other fraternities being formed possessed "many objectionable features which rendered them liable to be used as engines of evil as well as instruments of good."

The fraternity was formally founded on August 8, 1839, by eight male students of Miami University. Its founders included:

- Thomas Boston Gordon
- Charles Henry Hardin
- John Reily Knox
- David Linton
- Samuel Taylor Marshall
- James George Smith
- Michael Clarkson Ryan
- John Holt Duncan

In 1879, Beta Theta Pi became the first college fraternity to publish its constitution.

=== Men of Principle initiative ===
In August 1996, St. Lawrence University Chairman and Beta Theta Pi alumnus E.B. Wilson wrote a letter to the editor of The Beta Theta Pi magazine challenging the general fraternity to undertake a project to reverse the emerging Greek and Beta culture, which he felt was not in line with their core values.

In response to Wilson and several institutional difficulties, the Men of Principle initiative was started during the 1998–99 academic year. Three chapters, Nebraska, Georgia, and Pennsylvania, were used as pilot chapters for the new program. After this first year of piloting, the Men of Principle initiative was officially introduced at the 160th General Convention in Oxford, in 1999.

Since the beginning of the initiative in 1998, its international headquarters closed 64 chapters by 2008 and 85 chapters by 2013 for hazing or failing to comply with standards set by the Men of Principle initiative. As of 2019, approximately 25,000 members graduated from one of the fraternity's leadership programs.

The program was later renamed the "John and Nellie Wooden Institute for Men of Principle", named for member and basketball coach John Wooden, in Oxford, Ohio.

== Symbols ==
The five core values espoused by Beta Theta Pi are cultivation of intellect, responsible conduct, mutual assistance, integrity, and trust. These are the underpinnings for their mission statement to "develop men of principle for a principled life."

=== Coat of arms ===
The coat of arms of Beta Theta Pi includes the Beta dragon, which, according to the symbolism guide, differs from other artistic or historical concepts of dragons as it is not intended to represent evil or a threat. The fraternity explains it represents courage and respect, depicted as "...calm and caring, rather than [as] many other dragons that are made to seem threatening or aggressive." In the coat of arms, the Beta dragon is placed on top of a shield; the shield is emblazoned with the three stars of Beta Theta Pi and other stylizations from heraldry. Under that shield is a golden banner upon which is one of Beta's mottos "__kai__".

=== Flag ===
The flag of Beta Theta Pi similarly displays several symbols of the fraternity. The flag includes three horizontal stripes, blue, then white, and then blue. The flag shows three five-pointed stars that are made to form an equilateral triangle. The Beta dragon is set within this equilateral triangle.

=== Flower ===
Beta has designated as its official flower the Beta rose. The fraternity explains that "this light pink rose was officially made the flower of Beta Theta Pi in 1889 at the fraternity's semi-centennial convention. The Beta rose was chosen to be the flower by a Beta sweetheart named Leila McKee who had many relations to Beta throughout her life. Her father was a Beta, her brother was a Beta, and she eventually became a Beta sweetheart herself. This rose was accepted by the fraternity because of the purity and beauty that it held."

=== Badge ===
The badge of Beta Theta Pi was designed to be worn by members of the association under their original constitution that was produced and published in 1839. Over time, the badge's look has been changed multiple times, but the badge that is currently used today was made by Major George M. Chandler, Michigan 1898. The badge is an 8-sided shield of black and gold and it contains the three stars of the fraternity on the top of the shield and under that is a diamond which is surrounded by a golden laurel. Under the diamond is the capital Greek letters for Beta Theta Pi and below those letters are the Greek characters that represent 1839, the year of the fraternity's founding. Members of Beta wear this badge over their hearts to be "in a manner befitting the honor and dignity to which it is entitled".

The pledge pin is a pin that is worn by pledges of the fraternity. The pledge pin looks similar to the Beta badge, it is an 8-sided shield of white and gold that has 3 golden 5-pointed stars running diagonally across it.

=== Colors ===
The colors that represent Beta Theta Pi are delicate shades of pink and blue. These colors were chosen in the late 1800s when many fraternities were deciding what colors they wanted to represent them. Delicate shades of pink and blue symbolize gentlemen and chivalry, and were chosen for Beta because of their difficulty to produce and sensitivity to stains. Many times people have tried to change the official Beta colors to darker shades of blue and red but these ideas have always been turned down quickly.

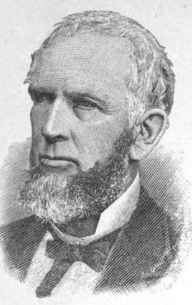
Founder John Reily Knox in 1886

=== Poem ===
Beta Theta Pi uses the poem The Bridge Builder as a symbol of its will and estate giving program.

== Notable members ==
Beta Theta Pi has notable members across industries, including more U.S. Supreme Court justices (8), Rhodes Scholars (85), and members of the U.S. Senate and House of Representatives than any other fraternity.

The following is a select group of notable Beta Theta Pi members.

- Richard Lugar (Denison University, 1954), US Senator for Indiana
- Bill Nelson (University of Florida, 1965), congressman and administrator for NASA in 2021
- Bill Bowerman (University of Oregon, 1933), Founder of Nike
- Dan Carney (Wichita State University, 1953), Founder of Pizza Hut
- Chris DeWolfe (University of Washington, 1988), Founder of Myspace.com, CEO of SGN Games
- Charles G. Koch (Massachusetts Institute of Technology, 1957), Founder and CEO of Koch Industries
- Bruce Nordstrom (University of Washington, 1955), CEO of Nordstrom
- Donald Petersen (University of Washington, 1946), CEO of the Ford Motor Company
- Sam Walton (University of Missouri, 1940), Founder of Walmart
- Mike Brown (Dartmouth College, 1957), Owner of the Cincinnati Bengals
- Don Coryell (University of Washington, 1947), Coach of the San Diego Chargers
- Shahid Khan (University of Illinois, 1971), Owner of the Jacksonville Jaguars, Fulham FC, AEW
- Mike Schmidt (Ohio University, 1971), baseball player for the Philadelphia Phillies and Baseball Hall of Fame inductee
- John Wooden (Purdue University, 1932), Men's basketball coach at UCLA
- Robert Engle (Williams College, 1964), Economist and Nobel Memorial Prize in Economic Sciences winner
- Dale Mortensen (Willamette University, 1961), Economist and Nobel Memorial Prize in Economic Sciences winner
- George Whipple (Yale University, 1903), Physician and Nobel Prize in Physiology or Medicine winner
- William "Adam West" Anderson (Whitman College, 1951), actor who played the first Batman

== Local chapter or member misconduct ==
As part of a multi-year dispute over co-ed student housing issues, the Beta Theta Pi chapter at Wesleyan University had been refusing access to campus security personnel. In March 2010, Wesleyan issued a warning to students to avoid the chapter house. In October of that year, a freshman was raped by a non-member, non-student at a Beta Theta Pi Halloween party. In 2012, a lawsuit by a female student at Wesleyan University accused the university's chapter of sexual assault and called its fraternity house a "rape factory" due to the predatory practices present and constant sexual assaults of young women visiting the house. Both the fraternity and the university reached an out-of-court settlement with the victim in 2014.

In March 2013, the Carnegie Mellon University chapter was suspended following a police investigation of sexually explicit videos and photographs of female students circulating among members.

In December 2014, the University of California, Santa Barbara chapter was shut down after years of violations and suspensions. Two pledges were sent to the hospital due to hazing which prompted the fraternity's national office to finally close the chapter.

In 2017, the Pennsylvania State University chapter was permanently disbanded due to the death of a pledge, Tim Piazza, related to hazing and alcohol abuse. Piazza was forced to drink excessive amounts of alcohol and fell down the stairs into the basement, where he eventually fell into a coma and died. The members of the fraternity had purposefully destroyed video footage of what happened in the basement. Eighteen members of the fraternity were arrested and charged for his wrongful death. The former chapter faces more than 147 charges, including involuntary manslaughter and tampering with evidence.

== See also ==
- List of social fraternities and sororities

== Sources ==
- Brown, James T., ed., Catalogue of Beta Theta Pi, New York: 1917.
