= 24th Independent Battery New York Light Artillery =

24th Independent Battery, New York Volunteer Light Artillery
- Active: February 11, 1863
- Allegiance: (United States) United States; Union
- Branch: United States Army; Union Army
- Type: Artillery
- Part of: Attached to Artillery Brigade, Department of North Carolina
- Engagements: American Civil War

The 24th Independent Battery, New York Volunteer Light Artillery was an American Civil War regiment from New York.

== History ==
Organized as Battery "B", New York Rocket Battalion, and designated 24th Battery February 11, 1863, having served as such provisionally from October 19, 1862. Attached to Artillery Brigade, Dept. of North Carolina, to January 1863. Artillery Brigade, 18th Army Corps, Dept. of North Carolina, to May 1863. District of the Albemarle, Dept. of North Carolina, to July 1863, and Dept. of Virginia and North Carolina to February 1864. District of Plymouth, N. C., to April 1864.

== Service ==
- Expedition from New Berne, N. C., November 2–12, 1862.
- Action at Rawle's Hill November 2.
- Demonstration on New Berne November 11.
- Foster's Expedition to Goldsboro December 11–20.
- Action at Kinston December 14,
- Action at Whitehall December 16.
- Action at Goldsboro December 17.
- Duty at New Berne, N. C., until March, 1863.
- Expedition from New Berne to Trenton, Pollockville, Young's Cross Roads and Swansborough March 6–10.
- Expedition to Plymouth, N. C., March 27-April 1, and duty there until April, 1864.
- Expedition from Plymouth to Foster's Mills July 26–29, 1863.
- Expedition to Lake Phelps January 27, 1864.
- Siege of Plymouth, N. C., April 17–20. Captured April 20.
- Transferred to 3rd New York Light Artillery as Battery "L" March 8, 1865.
- Joined Regiment in Dept. of North Carolina May 28, 1865.

Battery lost during service 4 men killed in action or mortally wounded and 77 men dead from disease, for a total of 81 fatalities.

== See also ==
- List of New York Civil War regiments
