= 1st Alabama Cavalry Regiment (Confederate) =

- Flag of Alabama in 1861 (obverse and reverse)
- Active: November 1861 to April 1865
- Country: Confederate States of America
- Allegiance: Alabama
- Branch: Confederate States Army Cavalry
- Engagements: Battle of Shiloh; Battle of Boonville; Battle of Perryville; Battle of Stone's River; Battle of Chickamauga; Atlanta campaign Battle of Bentonville

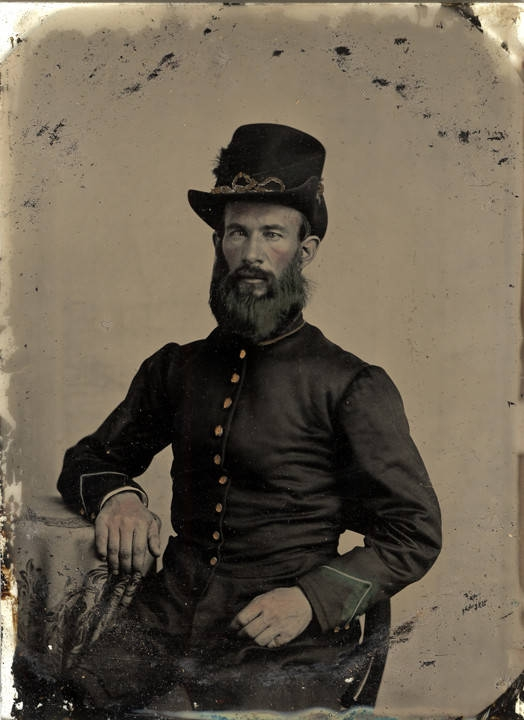
1st Lt. John F. Gaines, Montgomery Mounted Rifles, Co. B, 1st Alabama Cavalry; later Lt. Col. of the 53rd Alabama Cavalry Partisan Rangers.

The 1st Alabama Cavalry Regiment served in the Confederate Army during the American Civil War.

== Service ==
The 1st Alabama Cavalry Regiment was raised at Montgomery, Alabama, in November 1861. Its men were raised out of the following counties: Montgomery, Morgan, Dale, Tallapoosa, Calhoun, Pike, Autauga, Monroe, Butler, and Mobile.

Ordered to Tennessee, the regiment fought at the Battle of Shiloh in April 1862. It then fought at the Battle of Booneville, Mississippi, and Blackland. In Kentucky with General Joseph Wheeler, it was engaged at the Battle of Perryville in October 1862. Returning to middle Tennessee, the regiment lost many men at the Second Battle of Murfreesboro, Battle of Stones River in December 1862 and January 1863. On the retreat to Tullahoma and Chattanooga, it again lost many men at Duck River. In September 1863, the regiment fought at the Battle of Chickamauga. In east Tennessee with Longstreet, it fought at Clinton, Knoxville, and Mossy Creek. It was part of the force on the Sequatchee raid, fought at Dandridge. During Sherman's Atlanta campaign, the regiment harassed the enemy. Again, in Tennessee, it fought at Waynesboro, and at Fiddler's Pond. Then, it fought at Kilpatrick, Averysboro, and Bentonville.

Near Raleigh, North Carolina, a few days before Lee's surrender, the regiment drove back the enemy. It then surrendered as part of William W. Allen's division at Salisbury, North Carolina, about 150 strong.

== Commanders ==
- Colonel James Holt Clanton
- Colonel William W. Allen

== See also ==
- List of Confederate units from Alabama
