= 8th Confederate Cavalry Regiment =

Cavalry regiment of the Confederate States Army

- Active: 1862–1865
- Disbanded: April 26, 1865
- Country: Confederate States
- Branch: Confederate States Army
- Type: Cavalry
- Size: Regiment
- Engagements: American Civil War: Battle of Shiloh; Battle of Booneville; Battle of Stones River; Chattanooga Campaign; Battle of Chickamauga; Atlanta Campaign; Battle of Saltville; Carolinas Campaign

The 8th Confederate Cavalry Regiment was a unit of the Confederate States Army during the American Civil War. Established by a July 1862 merger of two separate Alabama and Mississippi cavalry battalions, the 8th Confederate regiment fought in numerous battles of the Western Theater before surrendering in April, 1865 in North Carolina.

== Origins ==
The 8th Confederate Cavalry originated as a collection of independent cavalry battalions that had volunteered for service in 1861. The Mississippi contingent was established in the fall of 1861 by Major Charles Baskerville of Columbus. Baskerville had travelled to Richmond, Virginia and obtained permission from the Confederate Secretary of War, LeRoy Pope Walker, to raise a battalion of cavalry for 12 months service. This new unit was known variously as the Pope Walker Battalion, the 2nd Mississippi Cavalry Battalion, and the 4th Mississippi Battalion. Baskerville's men travelled north to Kentucky in late 1861 to join Confederate General Albert Sidney Johnston's forces there.

In early 1862, Baskerville's Mississippi battalion was merged with Lieutenant Colonel R.H. Brewer's Alabama cavalry battalion. These Alabama troops had also volunteered in the summer of 1861 and had gone to Kentucky at the same time as the Mississippians. Together they fought at the Battle of Shiloh under the name of the 2nd Mississippi and Alabama Battalion, led by Colonel William B. Wade. Wade was a Mississippian who had joined Baskerville's battalion and had served in the Mexican War. Since the unit now contained companies from two different states, it was reorganized in July 1862 and given a Confederate regimental designation. With another 3 Alabama companies added and new officers elected, it was re-designated as the 8th Confederate Cavalry Regiment.

Another unrelated unit based in the eastern theater and led by Colonel James Dearing was also sometimes known as the 8th Confederate Cavalry. However, that unit was more often referred to as Dearing's Confederate Cavalry Regiment rather than being known by a regimental number.

== History ==
Private Moses Alexander Taggart and Private William Taggart, Company B, 8th Confederate Cavalry.

Assigned to defensive duties in North Mississippi, the regiment fought at the July 1862 Battle of Booneville under General James Ronald Chalmers. It was then assigned to General Joseph Wheeler's cavalry division and fought in the Confederate Heartland Offensive in Kentucky leading up to the Battle of Stones River in late December. A number of the men and officers were captured at Shelbyville, Tennessee, following a clash between Wheeler's troops and the federals on June 27, 1863. In the fall of 1863 the 8th Confederate fought at the Battle of Chickamauga and joined the 1864 Atlanta Campaign as dismounted infantry.

Following Wheeler's final raid 1864 into Tennessee, part of the regiment was sent to the mountains of southwestern Virginia and fought at the Battle of Saltville in October, while the remainder was attached to General Chalmers' brigade of Forrest's Cavalry Corps. In the final stages of the war, the regiment was detached from Forrest's command and sent to join the Carolinas Campaign. The remnant of the 8th Confederate regiment, numbering only 100 men, surrendered in North Carolina with General Joseph E. Johnston's forces.

== Commanders ==
Commanders of the 8th Confederate Cavalry Regiment:

- Colonel William B. Wade
- Colonel Joseph H. Field
- Lieutenant Colonel Jefferson Falkner
- Lieutenant Colonel John S. Prather

== See also ==
- List of Confederate Government units in the American Civil War
