= Battle of Booneville =

Battle of the American Civil War

Coordinates: 34.655050°N 88.562233°W

- Part of the American Civil War
Date	July 1, 1862
Location	Booneville, Mississippi
Result	Union victory

Belligerents
United States	Confederate States

Commanders and leaders
Henry W. Halleck; Philip Sheridan	P.G.T. Beauregard; James R. Chalmers

Strength
800	4,700

Casualties and losses
1 killed, 24 wounded, 16 missing	65 killed

The Battle of Booneville was fought on July 1, 1862, in Booneville, Mississippi, during the American Civil War. It occurred in the aftermath of the Union victory at the Battle of Shiloh and within the context of Confederate General Braxton Bragg's efforts to recapture the rail junction at Corinth, Mississippi, 20 miles (32 km) north of Booneville. Though greatly outnumbered, Union troops led by Colonel Philip Sheridan were able to rout the Confederate forces led by General James R. Chalmers.

== Opposing forces ==
=== Union ===
2nd Brigade, Cavalry Division, Army of the Mississippi, Col. Philip H. Sheridan:

Unit	Commander
2nd Michigan Cavalry	Cpt. Archibald P. Campbell
2nd Iowa Cavalry	Col. Edward Hatch

=== Confederate ===
Cavalry Brigade, General James Ronald Chalmers
A roster of the Confederate units engaged at Booneville is not included in the Confederate records, but Union records report the following regiments and "probably two others" were present under Chalmers' command:

Unit	Commander
8th Confederate Cavalry	Col. Richard H. Brewer
Wirt Adams' Cavalry Regiment	Col. Wirt Adams
Greer's Tennessee Regiment	--
First Alabama Battalion	--
Kentucky Battalion	--
1st Alabama Cavalry	James Holt Clanton
Balch's Tennessee Battalion	Maj. R.M. Balch

== Battle ==
After the Union Army victory at Shiloh, Maj. Gen. Henry W. Halleck moved his forces slowly toward Corinth, an important rail center. By May 25, 1862, after traveling 5 miles (8.0 km) in three weeks, Halleck was positioned to lay siege to the town. But on May 29, the Confederate forces under General P.G.T. Beauregard slipped away undetected and moved toward Tupelo, Mississippi. In late June, Halleck ordered his forces south and learned that the Confederates, by then under Bragg, were advancing toward Corinth. The 31-year-old Union Col. Philip Sheridan established a fortified position to the south at Booneville on June 28 to await the Confederate attack.

Lead elements of 4,700 troops under the Confederate Brig. Gen. James R. Chalmers, who was also 31 years old, encountered Sheridan's pickets on the morning of July 1, three and 1.8 miles (2.9 km) to the southwest of Corinth. The pickets fell back and established a sound defensive line at the intersection of the roads from Tupelo and Saltillo. Aided by the superiority of their new Colt revolving rifles, the line withstood the initial Confederate assault before withdrawing to a backup position 2 miles (3.2 km) closer to the town.

Chalmers' effort to turn the left flank of this new line was thwarted when Sheridan's main force joined the battle. The bulk of the Union force stayed on the defensive while Sheridan ordered Lt. Col. Edward Hatch in command of the 2nd Iowa Cavalry to select two companies of the 2nd Michigan Cavalry under Capt. Russell Alexander Alger and company "B" and company "F" of the 2nd Iowa Cavalry to circle around the enemy in secret and attack the rear of Chalmers' forces with saber and pistol while the remainder of the dismounted 2nd Michigan Cavalry and 2nd Iowa Cavalry attacked the Confederate forces from the front. The cavalry forces pushed Chalmers to retreat and Sheridan called off the pursuit after 4 miles (6.4 km), when his fatigued troops encountered swampy terrain.

== Aftermath ==
Sheridan estimated that Chalmers lost 65 troops killed in the battle; Federal casualties were one dead, 24 wounded, and 16 missing. Due to the battle, Bragg delayed his offensive strategy for Corinth, allowing Halleck additional time to unite his troops. In recognition of his performance against overwhelming odds, Sheridan was recommended for promotion to Brigadier General following this battle.
