= 50th Ohio Infantry Regiment =

American Civil War military unit

- Active: August 27, 1862, to June 26, 1865
- Country: United States
- Allegiance: Union
- Branch: Union Army
- Type: Infantry
- Engagements: Defense of Cincinnati; Battle of Perryville; Atlanta campaign; Battle of Kennesaw Mountain; Siege of Atlanta; Battle of Jonesboro; Second Battle of Franklin; Battle of Nashville; Carolinas campaign

The 50th Ohio Infantry Regiment was an infantry regiment in the Union Army during the American Civil War.

== Origin ==
In August 1861, the U.S. War Department authorized Michael Clarkson Ryan of Hamiton, Ohio to organize an "Irish Regiment". Thus, the 50th Ohio Infantry Regiment was composed of men of Irish descent. Ryan was appointed by Governor William J. Dennison Jr. to serve as the regiment's Colonel. C. L. Gano was appointed the regiment's major.

== Service ==
The 50th Ohio Infantry Regiment was organized at Camp Dennison near Cincinnati, Ohio and mustered in for three years of service on August 27, 1862, under the command of Colonel J. R. Taylor. The regiment was recruited in Allen, Auglaize, Belmont, Hamilton, Preble, Putnam, Shelby, Tuscarawas, and Van Wert counties. On December 31, 1864, the 99th Ohio Infantry was consolidated into the 50th Ohio Infantry.

The regiment was attached to the 34th Brigade, 10th Division, Army of the Ohio, September 1862. 34th Brigade, 10th Division, I Corps, Army of the Ohio, to November 1862. District of West Kentucky, Department of the Ohio, to May 1863. Unattached, 2nd Division, XXIII Corps, Department of Ohio, to August 1863. Unattached, 1st Division, XXIII Corps, to September 1863. District of South Central Kentucky, 1st Division, XXIII Corps, to April 1864. 3rd Brigade, 4th Division, XXIII Corps, to June 1864. 3rd Brigade, 2nd Division, XXIII Corps, Army of the Ohio, to February 1865, and Department of North Carolina to June 1865.

The 50th Ohio Infantry mustered out of service at Salisbury, North Carolina, on June 26, 1865.

== Detailed service ==
Ordered to Covington, Ky., September 1. Defense of Cincinnati, Ohio, against Kirby Smith's threatened attack. Moved to Louisville, Ky., September 20. Pursuit of Bragg into Kentucky October 1–15. Battle of Perryville, Ky., October 8. Moved to Lebanon, Ky., and duty there until February 1863. At Muldraugh's Hill, Ky., building fortifications and bridges over Sulphur and Rolling Forks of Green River until September. Also built Forts Boyle, Sands, and McAllister. Ordered to Nashville, Tenn., September 18; thence to Gallatin, Tenn., and to Glasgow, Ky., and to Knoxville, Tenn., December 25. March across mountains to Jacksboro December 26, 1863, to January 7, 1864. Duty there until February 22. At Knoxville and Loudoun until May. Moved to Cleveland, Tenn., thence march to Kingston, Ga., and joined Sherman's army May 23, 1864. Atlanta Campaign May 23-September 8. Kingston May 24. Operations on line of Pumpkin Vine Creek and battles about Dallas, New Hope Church, and Allatoona Hills May 25-June 5. Operations about Marietta and against Kennesaw Mountain June 10-July 2. Pine Hill June 11–14. Lost Mountain June 15–17. Muddy Creek June 17. Noyes Creek June 19. Kolb's Farm June 22. Assault on Kennesaw June 27. Nickajack Creek July 2–5. Chattahoochee River July 6–17. Decatur July 19. Howard House, Atlanta, July 20. Siege of Atlanta July 22-August 25. Utoy Creek August 5–7. Flank movement on Jonesboro August 25–30. Battle of Jonesboro August 31-September 1. Lovejoy's Station September 2–6. Camp at Decatur until October 4. Pursuit of Hood into Alabama October 4–26. Nashville Campaign November–December. Columbia, Duck River, November 24–27. Columbia Ford November 28–29. Battle of Franklin November 30. Battle of Nashville December 15–16. Pursuit of Hood to the Tennessee River December 17–28. Moved to Clifton, Tenn., and duty there until January 16, 1865. Movement to Washington, D.C., thence to Smithville, N. C., January 16-February 10. Operations against Hoke February 12–14. Fort Anderson February 18–19. Town Creek February 19–20. Capture of Wilmington February 22. Campaign of the Carolinas March 1-April 26. Advance on Goldsboro, N. C., March 6–21. Occupation of Goldsboro and Raleigh. Bennett's House April 26. Surrender of Johnston and his army. Duty at Raleigh until May 5, and Greensboro and Salisbury until June.

== Casualties ==
The regiment lost a total of 210 men during service; 6 officers and 70 enlisted men killed or mortally wounded, and 134 enlisted men died of disease.

== Commanders ==
- Colonel Michael Clarkson Ryan – died October 1862
- Colonel J. R. Taylor – resigned October 16, 1862
- Colonel Silas A. Strickland – commanded at the battle of Perryville as lieutenant colonel after Col. Taylor hid from enemy fire
- Lieutenant Colonel Hamilton S. Gillespie – commanded at the Battle of Nashville

== See also ==
- List of Ohio Civil War units
- Ohio in the Civil War
