= William W. Allen (general) =

William Wirt Allen
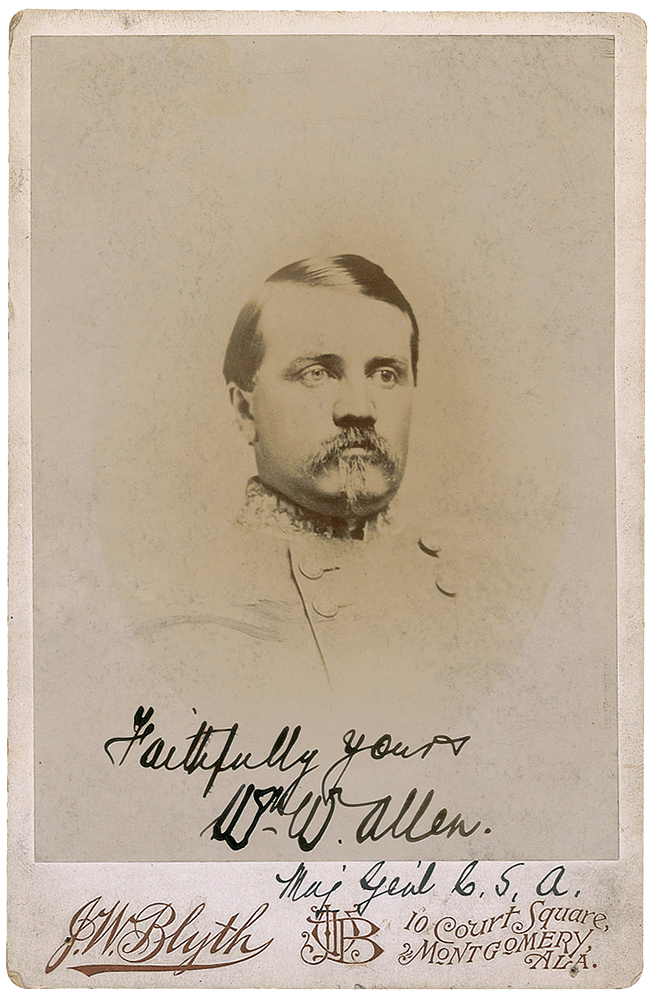
- Brig. Gen. William W. Allen
- Born: September 11, 1835; New York City, New York
- Died: November 21, 1894 (aged 59); Sheffield, Alabama
- Burial place: Elmwood Cemetery, Birmingham, Alabama
- Military career
- Allegiance: Confederate States of America
- Branch: (Confederate States of America) Confederate States Army
- Service years: 1861–1865
- Rank: Brigadier General
- Unit: Army of Tennessee
- Commands: 1st Franklin Alabama Volunteer Cavalry
- Conflicts: American Civil War: Battle of Shiloh; Battle of Perryville; Battle of Stones River; Atlanta campaign; Carolinas campaign
- Other work: Alabama state Adjutant General, farmer, U.S. marshal

William Wirt Allen (September 11, 1835 – November 21, 1894) was a Confederate military officer during the American Civil War. He rose through the ranks to command a division in the Cavalry Corps of the Army of Tennessee in the last days of the war in 1865.

== Early life and career ==
William W. Allen was born in New York City, New York to Wade Hampton Allen, a successful businessman with agricultural interests in the Southern United States, and Eliza Sayre Allen on September 11, 1835. Shortly after his birth, the family moved to Montgomery, Alabama, where Allen was educated before entering Princeton College in New Jersey. After graduation in 1854, he studied law but chose instead to return to plantation life. On August 13, 1857, in Montgomery, he married Susan P. Ball (1840–1915), and they raised eleven children.

== American Civil War ==
After Alabama declared secession, Allen enlisted in the newly raised Confederate States Army and was elected as a lieutenant in Company A, Montgomery Mounted Rifles. The following year, when the state organized the 1st Alabama Cavalry, Allen became its first major on March 18, 1862. He saw action at the Battle of Shiloh in April along the Tennessee River. He was subsequently promoted to colonel of the regiment before the Kentucky Campaign and led the 1st Alabama Cavalry at the Battle of Perryville, where he received a slight wound. Later that year, he was severely wounded in the Battle of Murfreesboro while in command of a brigade.

Out of action for over a year while recuperating from surgery which left him little use of his right hand, Allen returned to field duty in early 1864. On February 26 of that year, he was promoted to brigadier general and took command of a brigade of cavalry at Dalton, Georgia. His brigade was composed of the 1st, 3rd, 4th, 9th, 12th, and 51st Alabama Cavalry regiments, and they served in the corps of Joseph Wheeler in the Army of Tennessee. Allen led the brigade throughout the Alabama Campaign. In August, a Georgia cavalry brigade was added to Allen's force and, later, Anderson's Brigade. Allen, now in charge of a full division, participated in the Atlanta campaign in the summer, as well as contesting Sherman's March to the Sea (Savannah Campaign).

Although Confederate President Jefferson Davis appointed him a major general in February 1865, the Confederate States Congress did not confirm his promotion before it was dissolved. In early 1865, Allen's Division fought in the Carolinas campaign. Allen and his men surrendered at Concord, North Carolina, on May 3. He was paroled shortly thereafter as a brigadier general.

== Postbellum career ==
Allen returned home to Alabama and resumed his agricultural pursuits. He was also involved in the railroad industry and later served as the state's Adjutant General during the administration of President Grover Cleveland. He also was for a time a United States Marshal in Alabama. Allen helped found and organize the Confederate Survivors Association of Montgomery. His bullet-holed uniform coat and his battle-flag are buried in the cornerstone of the Confederate monument in Montgomery.

In 1893, William W. Allen moved to Sheffield, Alabama, where he died of heart disease the following year. He is buried in Birmingham's Elmwood Cemetery.

The Maj. Gen. William Wirt Allen, Chapter 199, of the Military Order of the Stars and Bars is named in his honor and memory.

== See also ==
- List of American Civil War generals (Confederate)
