= David Linton (politician) =

American politician (1815–1889)

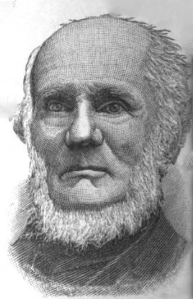
- Portrait of Linton, published 1886

Member of the Ohio Senate
- In office 1853–1855

Probate judge in Linn County
- In office 1869–1871

Personal details
- Born: January 30, 1815 Clinton County, Ohio, U.S.
- Died: August 10, 1889 (aged 74) Pleasanton, Kansas, U.S.
- Party: Republican
- Other political affiliations: Greenback
- Spouse: Anna Thomas (m. 1841)
- Education: Miami University (BA); Cincinnati Law School (LLB)
- Occupation: Politician; attorney; judge

David Linton (January 30, 1815 – August 10, 1889) was an American politician, attorney, and probate judge. He served in the Ohio Senate and was active in the Whig, Republican, and Greenback political parties in Ohio. He was one of the founders of Beta Theta Pi, a college fraternity founded at Miami University in 1839.

== Early life ==
Linton was born January 30, 1815, on a farm three miles west of in Wilmington in Clinton County, Ohio. His parents were Nathaniel Matthew Linton and Elizabeth Rachel Smith. He was their fifth child. His parents were early settlers in Ohio, moving there from Pennsylvania in 1800. Linton lived on the family farm until he was 21 years old, leaving at that time for Oxford, Ohio to attend Miami University.

Linton received an A.B. degree from Miami University in 1839. While at Miami, he was one of eight founders of Beta Theta Pi fraternity in 1839. He received an LL.B. from the Cincinnati Law School in 1840.

== Career ==
=== Law ===
Linton passed the bar and opened a law practice in Wilmington, Ohio. He was elected to the position of prosecuting attorney for Clinton County, serving two terms from 1845 to 1847. Over 25 years, he practiced law in state and federal courts in Ohio and adjacent states. He formed a partnership with Senator Joseph Foos for a number of years. His other partners included Tom Carwin, Allen G. Thurman, and Benjamin Wade.

In 1864, he retired to Kansas because of his declining health. He elected was a probate judge in Linn County, Kansas, serving one term from 1869 to 1871.

=== Politics ===
In 1840, Linton campaigned in his district for William Henry Harrison, a Whig who successfully ran for president. He worked to organize the Republican Party in 1850 and canvassed in his district for Abraham Lincoln in 1860.

Linton served in the Ohio Senate from 1853 to 1855. Later, he was a member of the Greenback Party. He was active with the party at the county level. He received a nomination to the State Senate as the Greenback candidate in 1876.

=== Business ===
Linton was a director of the Cincinnati, Wilmington & Zanesville Railroad and the Baltimore and Ohio Railroad.

== Personal life ==
Linton married Anna Thomas of Hamilton, Ohio on July 27, 1841. She met Linton when they were both students at Miami University. The couple had seven children.

Linton was ill with lung fever while in law school; the illness returned in 1848, resulting in ongoing health problems. Although he supported President Abraham Lincoln, Linton could not fight in the Civil War because of his poor health. He was also a member of the Society of Friends. Instead, he helped recruit several companies and made donations to care for sick and wounded soldiers.

In 1865, the family moved to a farm in Linn County, Kansas. Linton left his law practice in Ohio because of his health. Within a year of living in Kansas, his sons Frank and Arthur both died.

== Death and legacy ==
Linton had a second stroke in the fall of 1883 that paralyzed his left side and left him an invalid. No longer able to farm, he moved to Pleasanton, Kansas. He died on August 10, 1889, in his home in Pleasanton.

There is a historical marker about Linton in Wilmington, Ohio.

== See also ==
- List of Beta Theta Pi members
