= Edward McAlexander =

American politician

- Born: March 2, 1833; Alabama, U.S.
- Died: October 13, 1870 (aged 37); Lauderdale County, Alabama, U.S.
- Education: LaGrange College
- Occupations: Medical doctor, politician
- Spouses: Elizabeth J. Koger; Sarah A. Koger

Colonel Edward McAlexander (1833–1870) was an American Confederate veteran, medical doctor and politician.

== Early life ==
Edward McAlexander was born on March 2, 1833, in Alabama. He graduated from LaGrange College, now the University of North Alabama.

== Career ==
McAlexander was a medical doctor. During the American Civil War of 1861–1865, he joined the Confederate States Army and served in the 26th Regiment Alabama Infantry. He was promoted to the rank of Major on January 30, 1862, and as Colonel on April 9, 1865.

McAlexander served as a member of the Alabama House of Representatives from 1865 to 1867.

== Personal life and death ==
McAlexander was married twice: first to Elizabeth J. Koger, and secondly to Sarah A. Koger. He died on October 13, 1870, in Lauderdale County, Alabama. He was buried at the Florence Cemetery in Florence, Alabama.
