= Notary public (Florida) =

Public officer

In the U.S. state of Florida, a notary public is a public officer appointed by the governor of the state to take acknowledgments, administer oaths, attest to photocopies of certain documents, solemnize marriage, protest the non-acceptance or non-payment of negotiable instruments , and perform other duties specified by law.

A notary may only perform a notarial act upon receipt of satisfactory proof of identity (i.e. a driver's license or other form of identification card), or by the notary's own personal knowledge of the person appearing before them, or upon the sworn statement of two witnesses who personally know the person whose signature is to be authenticated. A notary may not notarize their own signature, or the signature of their spouse, parent, or child.

== Authority of a Florida notary public ==
Notaries public in Florida have the authority to take acknowledgments, administer oaths, solemnize marriage, certify the contents of a safe-deposit box, certify the vehicle identification number of a motor vehicle, and certify copies of documents which are not public records.

- Acknowledgments are usually taken in correlation with a real estate transaction, but are often used in cases where a mere "identity verification" is needed to ensure that the document is being executed by an authorized party.
- Oaths are administered orally in depositions and court hearings in which a party is being sworn in over the telephone instead of being personally present before a judge. In this respect, notaries administer oaths in the same way as a judge. Many court reporters are also notaries, as this allows one person to both swear the party in for a deposition and to transcribe the deposition. Oaths are also administered in the form of affidavits and other sworn statements on paper.
- Marriages may be legally solemnized by a notary public between parties who present the notary with a valid marriage license. The law has no requirements for the form of a marriage ceremony, therefore many notaries perform both civil and religious marriage ceremonies.
- The contents of a safe-deposit box are certified by a notary public in cases where the owner has died or otherwise abandoned the safe-deposit box. In this case, the notary must be present while a bank official and other witness open the box. The notary then certifies the contents of the box and makes a certificate thereof for presentation to the court or to the personal representative of the Decedent's estate.
- Notaries are authorized by Florida law to verify a vehicle identification number and certify this fact to the Department of Highway Safety and Motor Vehicles when that vehicle has not previously been registered with the state.
- A notary public may supervise the copying (or printing, as the case may be) of any record and attest to the trueness of the resulting copy or printout. The record being copied (or printed) cannot be a vital record, nor can it be a public record (if a copy can be obtained from the custodian of the public record).
- The most rare of notarial duties in Florida is the drafting of protests, i.e. certificates of dishonor, which certify that payment on a negotiable instrument has been refused. This is an antiquated act that appears only one place in the Florida statutes.

== Commission requirements ==
Any individual at least 18 years of age who is a resident of Florida may apply for and obtain commission as a notary public, provided that they have obtained a $7,500.00 public bond from an insurance company, and taken a notary education course administered by an authorized course provider. Such commission is usually obtained by legal secretaries, paralegals, and attorneys for use in their place of work, where the notarization of client signatures is a requirement on many court pleadings and other documents. However, occupation in the legal profession is not a prerequisite to becoming a notary, and a person of any profession may apply for and obtain a commission. Many banks also have notaries on staff to notarize the signatures of their customers.

== Seal requirements ==
Sample Florida notary stamp

A notary seal of the rubber stamp type is required to be affixed to all notarized paper documents. The rubber stamp must include the commissioned name of the notary public, the words "Notary Public-State of Florida", the notary's commission number, and the date on which the notary's commission expires. Prior to the mid-1970s, the only statutory requirement regarding notarial seals was that one be used and that it include the words "Notary Public" and "State of Florida at Large"; the name of the notary was optional, and the law did not specify what types of seals were permissible. This law was later amended to state that the seal must be round in design and of either the rubber stamp or impression type. In the early 1990s, the statute was again changed to require a rubber stamp seal, with an impression type seal being optional and not acceptable unless used in conjunction with a rubber stamp. However, many notaries continue to use the impression seal with their rubber stamp to allow for easy detection when trying to determine which document is an original. This process is made more difficult for notaries who only use a rubber stamp seal, as the Florida statutes require that the seal be affixed in only photographically-reproducible black ink.
