= 23rd Independent Battery New York Light Artillery =

23rd Independent Battery, New York Volunteer Light Artillery
- Active: November 1, 1862
- Disbanded: July 14, 1865
- Allegiance: Union Army
- Type: Artillery
- Role: Military
- Colors: Black and Green

The 23rd Independent Battery, New York Volunteer Light Artillery was a unit of the Union Army of the American Civil War

== History ==
This battery, originally Battery A, Rocket Battalion of Artillery, became the 23d Battery November 1, 1862; the change was, however, not final until it was approved February 11, 1863. It was recruited in the counties of Niagara, Essex and Warren; organized at Albany, and there mustered in the service of the United States for three years December 6, 1861.

At the expiration of its term of service, the men entitled thereto were discharged and the battery continued in service. It left the State on December 9 commanded by Captain Alfred Ransom, and served at Washington, D.C, from December 1861.

From December, 1862; in the district of Pamlico, Department of North Carolina, and in the district of North Carolina, Department of Virginia and North Carolina, from May, 1863; with the Cavalry Division, General Sherman's forces, from April 1, 1865. July 14, 1865, the battery, commanded by Captain Samuel Kittinger, Jr., was honorably discharged and mustered out at Fort Porter, Buffalo, N. Y., having, during its service, lost by death of disease and other causes, 46 enlisted men.

== Service ==
The 23rd Independent Battery New York Light Artillery has been caught up in 19 battles in the civil war in November 1862.

=== Casualties ===
The battery lost 46 Enlisted men by disease during service in the American Civil War.

== See also ==
- List of New York Civil War regiments
