= List of Confederate units from Tennessee in the American Civil War =

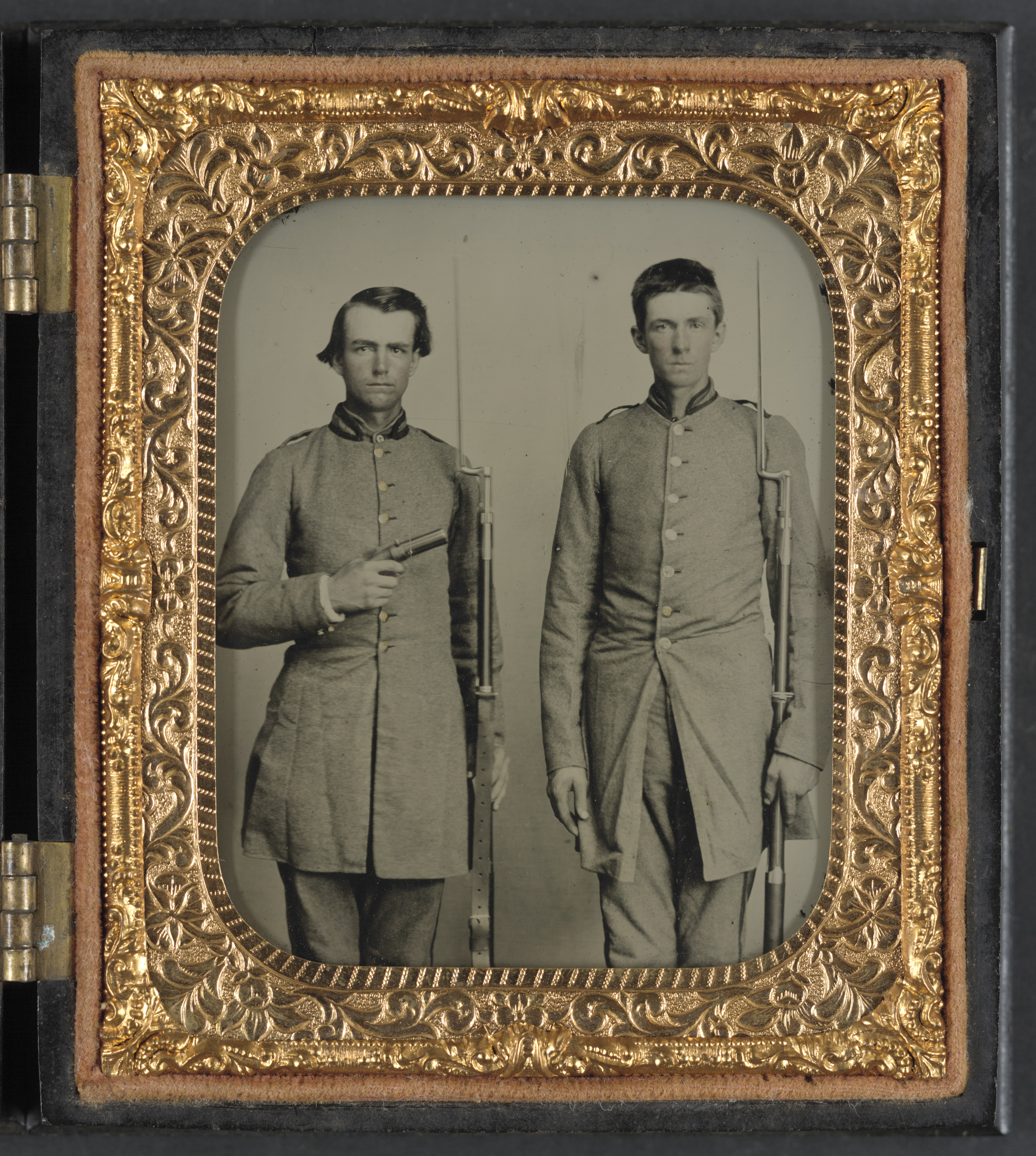
Two unidentified soldiers from Tennessee in Confederate uniforms with rifles and pepperbox pistol

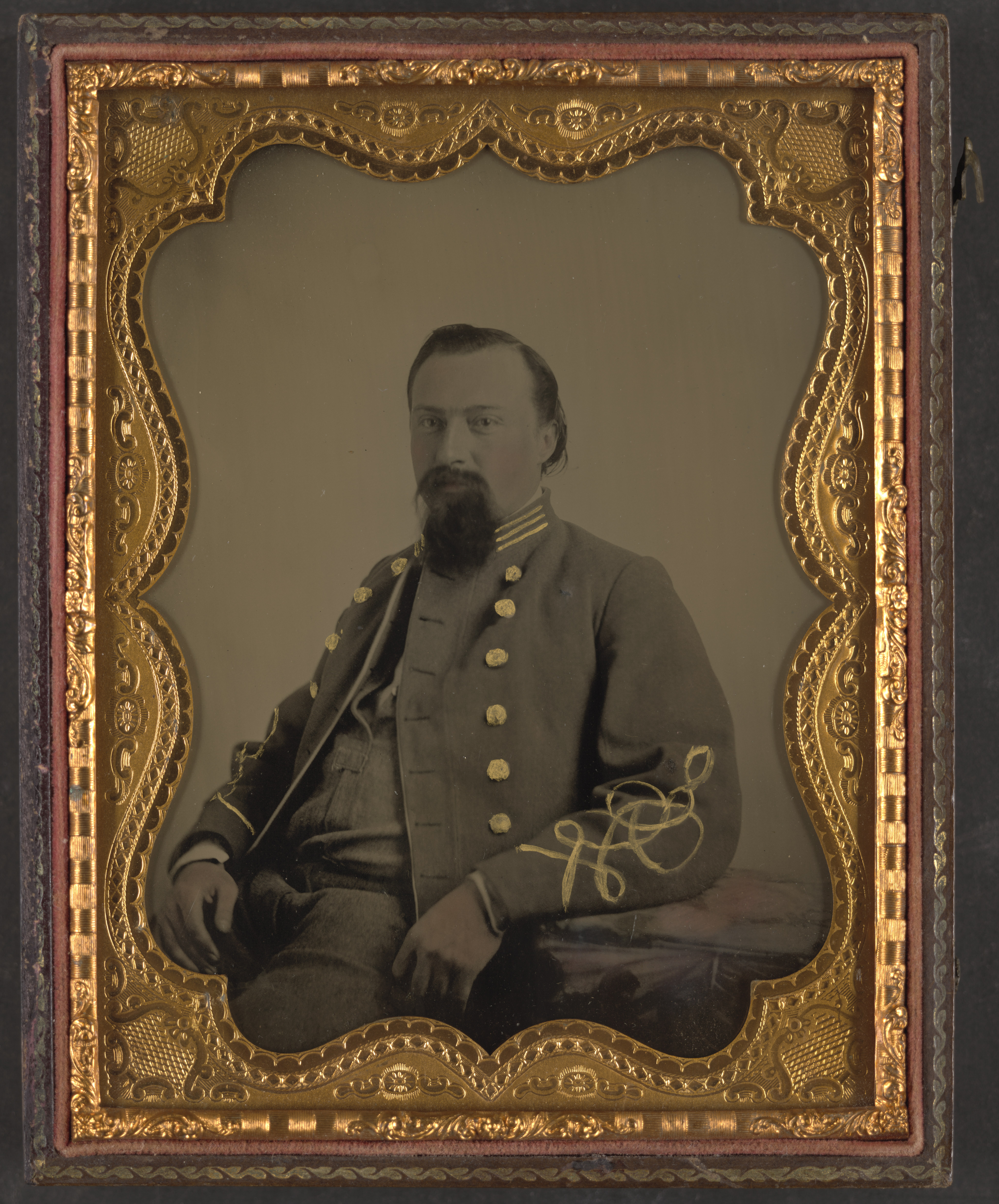
Major Philip Van Horn Weems of Co. H, 11th Tennessee Infantry Regiment

This is a list of Confederate units from the state of Tennessee. The list of Union units from Tennessee is shown separately.

== Infantry ==
- 1st (Maney's/Field's) Infantry
  - Rock City Guards
- 1st (Turney's) Infantry
- 1st Zouaves
- 2nd (Robison's) Infantry (Walker Legion)
- 2nd (5th, 9th Confederate, or Walker's) Infantry
- 3rd (Clack's) Infantry
- 3rd (3rd Mountain Rifle, Lillard's, or Vaughan's) Infantry
- 4th Infantry
- 5th Infantry
- 6th Infantry
- 7th Infantry
- 8th Infantry
- 9th Infantry
- 10th Infantry
- 11th Infantry
- 12th Infantry
- 13th Infantry
- 14th Infantry
- 15th Infantry
- 16th Infantry
- 17th Infantry
- 18th Infantry
- 19th Infantry
- 20th Infantry
- 21st Infantry
- 22nd Infantry (Freeman's Regiment)
- 23rd Infantry
- 24th Infantry
- 25th Infantry
- 26th (3rd East Tennessee) Infantry
- 27th Infantry
- 28th Infantry
- 28th (2nd Mountain) Infantry
- 29th Infantry
- 30th Infantry
- 31st (39th, 39th Mountain Rifle, or Bradford's) Infantry
- 32nd Infantry
- 33rd Infantry
- 34th Infantry (4th Confederate or 4th Provisional) Infantry
- 35th (1st Mountain Rifle or 5th Provisional) Infantry
- 36th Infantry
- 37th (1st East Tennessee Rifle or 7th Provisional) Infantry
- 38th (8th or Looney's) Infantry
- 39th (4th Confederate or Avery's) Infantry
- 40th (5th Confederate or Walker's) Infantry
- 41st Infantry
- 42nd Infantry
- 43rd (5th East Tennessee or Gillespie's) Infantry
- 44th Infantry
- 45th Infantry
- 46th Infantry
- 47th Infantry
- 48th (54th Consolidated, Nixon's, or Voorhies') Infantry
- 49th Infantry
- 50th Infantry
- 51st Infantry
- 52nd Infantry
- 53rd Infantry
- 54th Infantry
- 55th (Brown's) Infantry
- 55th (McKoin's) Infantry
- 56th (46th-55th Consolidated or Brown's) Infantry
- 59th (Cooke's, Mounted, or 1st (Eakin's) Battalion) Infantry
- 60th (60th Mounted, 79th Mounted, or Crawford's) Infantry
- 61st Infantry (Pitts' Regiment, 61st Mounted Infantry, 81st Infantry)
- 62nd Infantry (Rowan's Regiment, 62nd Mounted Infantry, 80th Infantry)
- 63rd (Fain's or 74th) Infantry
- 84th Infantry
- 154th Senior (1st Volunteer) Infantry
- Harman's Infantry
- 1st (Colms'), Infantry
- 3rd (Memphis) Infantry Battalion
- 22nd (Murray's) Infantry Battalion
- 23rd (Newman's) InfantryvBattalion
- 24th Infantry Battalion
- Crew's Battalion, Infantry
- Nashville (Hawkins') Infantry Battalion
- Sowell's Infantry Detachment
- Spencer's Infantry Company
- Tackitt's Infantry Company

=== Consolidated Infantry ===
- 1st and 27th Infantry
- 2nd (Walker's)-21st Consolidated Tennessee Infantry Regiment (5th Confederate Infantry; 9th Confederate Infantry; 5th Confederate Regiment, Tennessee Infantry)
- 3rd (Clack's)-18th-30th Consolidated Tennessee Infantry Regiment
- 4th-5th Consolidated Tennessee Infantry Regiment
- 6th-9th Consolidated Tennessee Infantry Regiment
- 8th-28th-84th Consolidated Tennessee Infantry Regiment
- 11th-29th Consolidated Tennessee Infantry Regiment
- 12th-22nd-47th Consolidated Tennessee Infantry Regiment
- 13th-154th Consolidated Tennessee Infantry Regiment
- 15th-37th Consolidated Tennessee Infantry Regiment (7th Regiment Provisional Army of Tennessee, 1st East Tennessee Rifle Regiment)
- 17th-23rd Consolidated Tennessee Infantry Regiment
- 25th-44th-55th (McKoin's) Consolidated Tennessee Infantry Regiment
- 31st-33rd Consolidated Tennessee Infantry Regiment
- 34th-24th (Btln) Consolidated Tennessee Infantry Regiment (4th Confederate Regiment, Tennessee Infantry)
- 35th-48th (Nixon's) Consolidated Tennessee Infantry Regiment (temporary) (5th Regiment Provisional Army of Tennessee, 1st Mountain Rifle)
- 45th-23rd (Btln) Consolidated Tennessee Infantry Regiment
- 46th-55th (Brown's) Consolidated Tennessee Infantry Regiment (56th Tennessee Infantry)
- 48th (Voorhies')-54th Consolidated Tennessee Infantry Regiment (48th (Nixon's) Infantry)
- 49h-50th-7th (Texas) Consolidated Tennessee Infantry Regiment (temporary) (Bailey's Tennessee Infantry Regiment)
- 50th-1st (Colms' Btln) Consolidated Tennessee Infantry Regiment
- 51st-52nd Consolidated Tennessee Infantry Regiment
- 1st Consolidated Regiment, Tennessee Infantry (1st-27th, 6th-9th, 8th-28th-84th and 16th Regiment and 34th-24th Sharpshooters)
- 2nd Consolidated Regiment, Tennessee Infantry (11th-29th, 12th-22nd-47th, 13th-154th, 50th and 51st-52nd Regiments)
- 3rd Consolidated Regiment, Tennessee Infantry (4th-5th, 19th, 24th, 31st-33rd, 35th, 38th and 41st Regiments and 22nd Battalion)
- 4th Consolidated Regiment, Tennessee Infantry (5th Confederate, 3rd-18th-30th, 10th, 15th-37th, 20th, 26th and 32nd Regiments and 45th-23rd Btln)

=== Sharpshooters ===
24th (Maney's) Battalion, Sharp Shooters was Captain Frank Maney's Company, Light Artillery, which was organized September 7, 1861; surrendered at Fort Donelson; reorganized December 1, 1862 as light artillery, but armed temporarily as infantry. It fought in the Battle of Murfreesboro with the 1st (Feild's) Tennessee Infantry. It never was re-armed as artillery, but instead two companies, which had been organized in December 1862 were added to it, and it was formed into a battalion with the election of Captain Frank Maney as major. reorganized May 1, 1863; served as Sharpshooters for Maney's Brigade, Cheatham's Division, Army of Tennessee; as part of 1st Consolidated Tennessee Infantry Regiment.Regiment, commanded by Lieutenant Colonel Oliver A. Bradshaw. This regiment was surrendered and paroled at Greensboro, North Carolina, May 1, 1865.

Captains:

- Frank Maney, (to major) Hugh M. McAdoo, Co. "A". Organized September 7, 1861 from Humphreys County. Formerly Maney's Light Artillery, also called Humphreys Light Artillery.
- Robertson Garrett, Co. "B". Organized December 13, 1862 from Humphreys Countv. Reported to General George E. Maney at Shelbyville, January 5, 1863. The company was merged into the 1st Consolidated Tennessee Infantry Regiment on April 9, 1865, and became company H.
- John M. McAdoo, Co. "C". Organized December 16, 1862 from Humphreys County. Reported to General Maney at Shelbyville early in 1863.

== Cavalry ==
- 1st Confederate Cavalry Regiment (12th Confederate Cavalry Regiment)
- 1st (Roger's) Cavalry ( 1st (Rogers') East Tennessee Cavalry Regiment; 2nd (MeLin's) Cavalry Regiment; 5th (McKenzie's) Cavalry)
- 1st (Carter's) Cavalry
- 2nd (Ashby's) Cavalry
- 2nd (Smith's) Cavalry
- 3rd (Forrest's Old) Cavalry
- 3rd (Lillard's) Cavalry (3rd Mounted Infantry, 3rd (Vaughan's) Infantry)
- 4th (McLemore's) Cavalry
- 4th (Murray's) Cavalry * (8th (Smith's) Cavalry)
- 5th (McKenzie's) Cavalry (1st (Roger's) Cavalry)
- 6th (Wheeler's) Cavalry (1st Cavalry, 2nd Cavalry)
- 7th (Jackson's/Stock's/Duckworth's) Cavalry (1st Cavalry)
- 8th (Smith's) Cavalry (4th (Murray's) Cavalry)
- 9th (Ward's/Bennett's) Cavalry (13th Cavalry, 15th Cavalry)
- 10th (De Moss') Cavalry
- 11th (Holman's) Cavalry
- 12th (Richardson's/Green's) Cavalry (1st Partisan Rangers Regiment, 12th Partisan Rangers Regiment)
- 13th (Dibrell's/Gore's) Cavalry (8th Cavalry)
- 14th (Neely's) Cavalry (13th Cavalry)
- 15th (Stewart's) Cavalry
- 16th (Logwood's) Cavalry
- 17th (Marshall's) Cavalry (16th Cavalry)
- 18th (Newsom's) Cavalry (19th Cavalry)
- 19th (Biffle's) Cavalry (9th Cavalry)
- 20th (Russell's) Cavalry (15th Cavalry)
- 21st (Carter's) Cavalry (Wheeler's Scouts)
- 21st (Wilson's) Cavalry (16th Cavalry)
- 22nd (Barteau's) Tennessee Cavalry Regiment
- 22nd (Nixon's) Cavalry (20th Cavalry)
- 28th (Hay's) Cavalry
- Collins' Regiment, Cavalry
- Franklin' Regiment, Cavalry
- Cooper's Regiment/Battalion, Cavalry
- 1st (McNairy's) Battalion, Cavalry (1st West Tennessee Battalion, 1st Middle Tennessee Battalion)
- 2nd (Biffle's) Battalion, Cavalry (3rd Battalion, Jones' Battalion, Cox's 3rd Battalion)
- 3rd (Brazleton's) Battalion, Cavalry (2nd Battalion, 5th Battalion)
- 4th (Branner's) Battalion, Cavalry
- 4th (Hamilton's) Battalion, Cavalry (4th Tennessee Cavalry Regiment, Shaw's Battalion)
- 5th (McClellan's) Battalion, Cavalry
- 6th (Logwood's) Battalion, Cavalry (1st Battalion)
- 7th (Bennett's) Battalion, Cavalry
- 9th (Gantt's) Battalion, Cavalry
- 11th (Gordon's) Battalion, Cavalry (10th Battalion)
- 12th (Day's) Battalion, Cavalry (Adrian's Partisan Ranger Battalion, Phipps' Battalion)
- 16th (Neal's) Battalion, Cavalry (Rucker's Battalion)
- 17th (Sander's) Battalion, Cavalry, see 9th Mississippi Cavalry
- 27th (Daniel's) Battalion, Cavalry
- Cox's Independent Battalion, Cavalry
- McCann's Battalion, Cavalry
- Napier's Battalion, Cavalry
- Spiller's Battalion, Cavalry
- Allison's Squadron, Cavalry
- Clark's (Captain) Independent Company, Cavalry
- Jackson's (Captain) Company, Cavalry (Gen. Forrest's Escort Company)
- Parton's Company, Cavalry
- Stone's Company A, Lyons Cavalry
- William's Company, Cavalry
- Woodward's Company, Cavalry

=== Consolidated ===
- 10th-11th Consolidated Tennessee Cavalry Regiment
- 15th-16th Consolidated Tennessee Cavalry Regiment
- 19th-20th Consolidated Tennessee Cavalry Regiment
- 21st-22nd (Barteau's) Consolidated Tennessee Cavalry Regiment

=== Mounted Infantry ===
- 3rd Mounted Infantry (3rd (Vaughan's) Infantry, 3rd (Lilliard's) Cavalry)
- 39th Mounted Infantry (31st (Bradford's) Infantry, 39th (Bradford's) Infantry)
- 59th Mounted Infantry (Cooke's Regiment, 1st (Eakin's) Battalion, 59th Infantry)
- 60th Mounted Infantry (Crawford's Regiment, 79th Infantry)
- 61st Mounted Infantry (Pitts' Regiment, 81st Infantry)
- 62nd Mounted Infantry (Rowan's Regiment, 80th Infantry)

== Artillery ==
=== Heavy Artillery ===
- 1st Tennessee Heavy Artillery (Jackson's Regiment)
  - Company B, 1st Tennessee Heavy Artillery (McClung's Guards Artillery; Company A, 1st Tennessee Heavy Artillery)
  - Company C, 1st Tennessee Heavy Artillery (Sterling's Company, Heavy Artillery)
  - Company H, 1st Tennessee Heavy Artillery (Hoadley's Battery; Magruder Guards; Company D, 4th Arkansas Infantry Battalion)
  - Company K, 1st Tennessee Heavy Artillery (Miller's Battery, Light Artillery; Pillow Flying Artillery)
  - Company L, 1st Tennessee Heavy Artillery (Johnston's Company, Heavy Artillery; Southern Guards Artillery; Memphis Southern Guards)
  - Lynch's Company, 1st Heavy Artillery Artillery (Lynch's Company, Light Artillery)
- A. P. Stewart's Heavy Artillery Battalion
- Caruther's Battery, Heavy Artillery
- Rice's Battery, Heavy Artillery (Rice's Battery, Light Artillery)

=== Light Artillery ===
- 1st Light Artillery Regiment (Tennessee Artillery Corps)
- 1st Light Artillery Battalion (1st Heavy Artillery Battalion)
- Monsarrat's Light Artillery Battalion
- Morton's Light Artillery Battalion
- Barry's Company, Light Artillery (Lookout Artillery)
- Baxter's (2nd) Company, Light Artillery
- Bibb's Company, Artillery (Washington Artillery; Company H, Tennessee Artillery Corps)
- Browne's Company, Light Artillery (Baker's Company)
- Burrough's Company, Light Artillery (Rhett Artillery)
- Crain's Battery, Light Artillery
- Fisher's Company, Artillery (Nelson Artillery; Battery G, 1st Light Artillery Regiment)
- Huggins' Company, Light Artillery (Baxter's 1st Company; Freeman's Horse Artillery, Company B, Monsarrat's Battalion)
- Kain's Company, Light Artillery (Mabry Light Artillery)
- Lynch's Company, Light Artillery (Lynch's Company, 1st Heavy Artillery Artillery)
- Maney's Company, Light Artillery (Humphrey's Battery; Company A, 24th Sharpshooter Battalion)
- Marshall's Company, Artillery (Steuben Artillery; Battery D, 1st Light Artillery Regiment)
- Marshall's Company, Artillery (Brown Horse Artillery)
- McClung's Company, Light Artillery (Caswell Artillery; Battery A, 1st Light Artillery Regiment)
- Miller's Battery, Light Artillery (Pillow Flying Artillery; Company K, 1st Heavy Artillery)
- Morton's Company, Light Artillery (Burns Light Artillery, Morton's Horse Artillery)
- Palmer's Company, Light Artillery (Reneau Battery)
- Phillips' Company, Light Artillery (Johnston Light Artillery)
- Polk's Battery, Light Artillery (Company G, Tennessee Artillery Corps)
- Ramsey's Battery, Artillery
- Rice's Battery, Light Artillery (Rice's Battery, Heavy Artillery)
- Rutledge's Battery, Light Artillery (Company A, Tennessee Artillery Corps)
- Scott's Company, Light Artillery (Company B, Tennessee Artillery Corps)
- Sparkman's Company, Light Artillery (Maury Artillery)
- Stewart's Company, Artillery (Company M, Tennessee Artillery Corps)
- Tobin's Company, Light Artillery (Memphis Light Battery, Tobin's Horse Artillery)
- Weller's Company, Light Artillery (Rock City Artillery; Battery B, 1st Light Artillery Regiment)
- Winson's Company, Light Artillery (Belmont Battery; Battery C, 1st Light Artillery Regiment)

=== Horse Artillery ===
- Freeman's Battery, Horse Artillery (Huggins' Company, Light Artillery; Baxter's 1st Company; Company B, Monsarrat's Battalion)
- Morton's Battery, Horse Artillery (Morton's Company, Light Artillery; Burns Light Artillery)
- Tobin's Battery, Horse Artillery (Tobin's Company, Light Artillery; Memphis Light Battery)
- White's Battery, Horse Artillery

== Misc ==
- Conscripts, Tennessee
- Detailed Conscripts, Tennessee (Local Defense and Special)
- Engineers Corps, Tennessee
  - Pickett's Company, Sappers and Miners
- Miscellaneous, Tennessee
- Service Troops, Nitre and Mining Bureau

=== Legions ===
- 1st East Tennessee Legion (Rucker's Legion)

=== Partisan Rangers ===
- Greer's Regiment, Partisan Rangers
- 1st Regiment, Partisan Rangers (12th Partisan Rangers Regiment, 12th Cavalry)
- 5th (Black's) Battalion, Partisan Rangers (Black's Battalion, Forrests Cavalry)
- Adrian's Battalion, Partisan Rangers (12th (Day's) Battalion, Cavalry; Phipps' Battalion)
- Douglass' Battalion, Partisan Rangers
- Holman's Battalion, Partisan Rangers

=== Militia ===
- 121st Regiment, Militia

=== Local Defense Troops ===
- Blair's Company (Local Defense Troops)
- McLin's Company, Volunteers (Local Defense Troops)
- Miller's Company, (Local Defense Troops)
- Park's Company (Local Defense Troops)
- Sullivan County Reserves (Local Defense Troops)

== See also ==
- Lists of American Civil War Regiments by State
- Confederate Units by State

== Sources ==
- "Tennesseans in the Civil War". Tennessee Genealogy Web Project. Civil War Centennial Commission of Tennessee.
- Hancock's diary, or, A history of the Second Tennessee Confederate Cavalry: with sketches of First and Seventh Battalions : also, portraits and biographical sketches : two volumes in one (1887) at the Internet Archive
