= James Mullins (American politician) =

American politician (1807–1873)

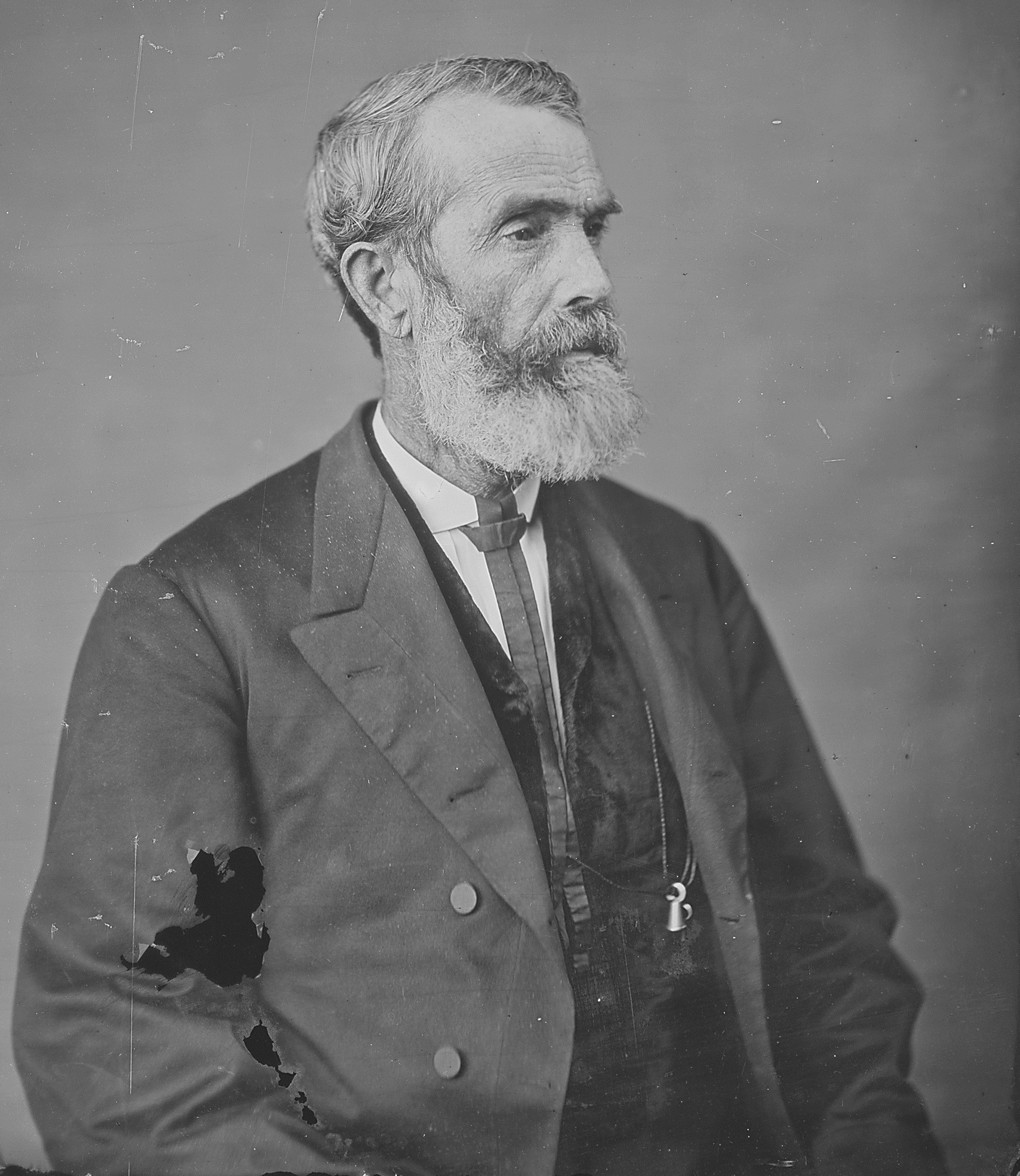

Member of the U.S. House of Representatives from Tennessee's 4th district
- In office March 4, 1867 – March 3, 1869
- Preceded by: Edmund Cooper
- Succeeded by: Lewis Tillman

Member of the Tennessee House of Representatives
- In office 1865-1867

Personal details
- Born: September 15, 1807 Bedford County, Tennessee, U.S.
- Died: June 26, 1873 (aged 65) Shelbyville, Tennessee, U.S.
- Resting place: Arnold Cemetery; Shelbyville, Tennessee, U.S.
- Party: Republican
- Profession: millwright, politician

James Mullins (September 15, 1807 – June 26, 1873) was an American politician who represented Tennessee's 4th congressional district in the United States House of Representatives from 1867 to 1869. He also served a single term in the Tennessee House of Representatives (1865–1867). Described as a "fierce fanatic of the Republican Party," Mullins supported the initiatives of Governor William G. Brownlow in the state legislature, most notably leading efforts to ratify the Fourteenth Amendment.

Mullins opposed Southern secession at the outbreak of the Civil War, and served in the Union Army as an advisor to General William Rosecrans during the war.

== Early life and Civil War ==
Mullins was born at "Three Forks of the Duck River" in Bedford County, Tennessee, on September 15, 1807. He initially worked as a farmer, but gradually turned to the milling business. By the outbreak of the Civil War, he had become a successful millwright, and owned several slaves. He was appointed a colonel in the Tennessee state militia in 1831, and served as Sheriff of Bedford County from 1840 to 1846. In 1843, he petitioned the state government for tax relief for Bedford County.

Mullins was originally a member of the Whig Party. After that party's dissolution in the mid-1850s, he aligned with the nativist American Party ("Know Nothings"), and was a member of the Bedford County delegation at Tennessee's American Party conventions in Nashville in February 1856 and February 1857 (his fellow Bedford Countian, William H. Wisener, was president of the latter convention). By the late 1850s, Mullins had thrown his support behind the Opposition Party, a hodgepodge group of ex-Whigs, ex-Know Nothings, and disgruntled Democrats formed to counter the rising secessionist sentiments championed by Southern Democrats. Mullins represented Bedford at the state's Opposition Party conventions in March 1859 and February 1860.

Mullins' opposition to secession put him at odds with Bedford County and Middle Tennessee in general, and he was compelled to flee in 1862. During the Civil War, he served in the Union Army from 1862 to 1864 as a member of the staff of General Williams Rosecrans, commander of the Army of the Cumberland. He was with the Army of the Cumberland at the battles of Stones River and Hoover's Gap, and during the Tullahoma Campaign.

In the years following the war, Mullins remained committed to Southern Unionist causes. He was a member of the Union League of America, and was a featured speaker at the Loyal Southern Convention in Philadelphia in September 1866.

== State legislature ==
At a statewide convention of Tennessee Unionists in January 1865, Mullins was nominated for the seat representing Bedford and Rutherford counties in the Tennessee House of Representatives. He was elected to the seat on March 4 of that year. The legislature convened in April, and quickly ratified the Thirteenth Amendment, which outlawed slavery.

While the state legislature was dominated during this period by Southern Unionists (ex-Confederates were barred from voting), a rift quickly developed between the "conservatives," who were aligned nationally with President Andrew Johnson, and the "radicals," who supported Governor William G. Brownlow, and were aligned nationally with the Radical Republicans. Conservatives, led by Speaker of the House William Heiskell, generally sought a return to pre-Civil War conditions (though with slavery outlawed), while Radicals wanted to extend voting rights to African-Americans and punish former Confederates. Mullins voted with the Radical block, and became one of Brownlow's staunchest allies in the state house.

In February 1866, a franchise bill was introduced in the legislature that would give Governor Brownlow the power to throw out the votes of any county in any election in which ex-Confederates were suspected of casting ballots. Conservative legislators opposed the bill, but having little chance of stopping its passage, fled the capital in an attempt to prevent a quorum. Mullins loudly accused the Speaker of the House, William Heiskell, of organizing the quorum bust. Enraged, Heiskell called Mullins a "God damned old liar and a damned thief," and threw his gavel at Mullins. Reports differ as to Mullins' response, with at least one stating he had to be restrained from attacking Heiskell, and another stating he merely placed the gavel in his pocket and called Heiskell a "darned old fool." The franchise bill passed a few weeks later.

Mullins was praised by radicals and derided by conservatives for his actions in the legislature. Brownlow's newspaper, the Knoxville Whig, stated that Mullins was a "terror to the copperheads" in the legislature, and described him as an "old patriot" who "stands like the pillars of the Alleghenies, unheeding the storms of copperheadism and treason, which beat in unrelenting fury above his head." The Cleveland Banner, on the other hand, stated that Mullins was "making an ass of himself."

In July 1866, Brownlow called a special session of the General Assembly to consider the Fourteenth Amendment, which extended civil rights to African Americans. Conservatives vehemently opposed the amendment and organized another quorum bust. After two of the quorum-busting legislators were arrested and confined to the House chamber, the radicals argued this constituted a quorum, and pushed through the vote in favor ratifying the amendment. Heiskell resigned the Speakership in disgust. Mullins served as Speaker pro tempore at various times in late 1866 and early 1867.

== Congress ==
Mullins was on the ballot for the 4th district congressional seat in 1865, but lost by a wide margin to Edmund Cooper, a state senator. A friend and confidant of Andrew Johnson, Cooper opposed the Radicals' agenda in Congress, and thus drew the ire of Brownlow. With the backing of Brownlow, Mullins again opposed Cooper for the congressional seat in 1867. Determined to defeat Johnson's ally, Brownlow dispatched two state guard companies to the fourth district, and prevented a large number of previously-eligible voters from registering. As a result, Mullins easily defeated Cooper, 9,448 votes to 3,225.

In Congress, Mullins served on the Committee on Territories and the Committee on Revolutionary Pensions. He was described as a "remarkably ready debater" who gave speeches "characterized by much native wit as well as rugged common sense." He voted to impeach Andrew Johnson in February 1868, and voted in favor of the Fifteenth Amendment (which extended voting rights to minorities) in February 1869.

During the late 1860s, Mullins became embroiled in a scandal when the Tennessee National Bank of Memphis, where the state's school fund had been deposited, failed. Mullins and several other former state legislators were accused of accepting bribes in exchange for supporting a measure that allowed the state treasurer (who eventually committed suicide) to deposit the fund in the Memphis bank. Mullins denied the charge, but his reputation nevertheless suffered.

Mullins did not seek reelection to a second consecutive term. The Brownlow faction was only able to hold the seat after Brownlow (using the powers granted him by the franchise law that Mullins and Heiskell had squabbled over) disqualified the votes from several counties, allowing Lewis Tillman to win. Mullins ran for the seat again in 1870, but with former Confederates having regained the right to vote, he was badly defeated by the Democratic candidate, John Morgan Bright, 11,827 votes to 1,843.

== Later life ==
In April 1869, President Ulysses S. Grant appointed Mullins internal revenue collector of the fourth district. He held this office until his death.

Mullins' support of black suffrage and other initiatives of the Radical Republicans made him a target of the burgeoning Ku Klux Klan. While Mullins was campaigning for Congress in October 1870, a group of Klansmen attacked his farm, burning his barn, stables, and mills. In January 1871, a group of Klansmen attempted to break into the home of J.L. Roseborough in Shelbyville, presumably to attack Mullins, who was boarding there, but failed to gain entry.

Mullins died of cholera in Shelbyville on June 26, 1873. He is interred in the Arnold Cemetery near Shelbyville.

U.S. House of Representatives
Preceded by Edmund Cooper	Member of the U.S. House of Representatives from Tennessee's 4th congressional district March 4, 1867 - March 3, 1869	Succeeded by Lewis Tillman
