= Edmund Cooper (politician) =

American politician (1821–1911)

Member of the U.S. House of Representatives from Tennessee's 4th district
- In office July 24, 1866 – March 3, 1867
- Preceded by: Andrew J. Clements
- Succeeded by: James Mullins

Personal details
- Born: September 11, 1821 Franklin, Tennessee, U.S.
- Died: July 21, 1911 (aged 89) Shelbyville, Tennessee, U.S
- Party: Conservative
- Education: Harvard University

Edmund Cooper (September 11, 1821 – July 21, 1911) was a United States representative from Tennessee.

== Biography ==
Cooper was born in Franklin, Tennessee. He was the brother of Henry Cooper.

Cooper graduated from Jackson College in 1839. He later studied law at Harvard University. He was admitted to the bar and commenced practice in Shelbyville, Tennessee, in 1841. A Whig, he served a single term in the Tennessee House of Representatives in 1849.

Cooper supported John Bell in the 1860 United States presidential election and was an elector on the Constitutional Union ticket. The Constitutional Union Party carried Tennessee in the general election, and Cooper voted for Bell and the former U.S. secretary of state Edward Everett at the meeting of the electoral college.

A Southern Unionist during the American Civil War, Cooper served as a secretary to military governor of Tennessee Andrew Johnson. Following the end of the war, he was a delegate to the 1865 state constitutional convention.

Upon the readmission of Tennessee to representation in the United States Congress, Cooper was elected as a Conservative representing Tennessee's 4th congressional district and served from July 24, 1866, to March 3, 1867. He was an unsuccessful candidate for reelection to the 40th Congress. On October 3, 1867, he replaced Robert Johnson, Andrew Johnson's son, as private secretary to the president.

He was appointed assistant secretary of the treasury by President Johnson on November 20, 1867, and served until March 20, 1869. He resumed the practice of law at Shelbyville and died there July 21, 1911. He was interred in Willow Mount Cemetery.

== Sources ==
- United States Congress. "Edmund Cooper (id: C000747)". Biographical Directory of the United States Congress.

U.S. House of Representatives
Preceded by Civil War	Member of the U.S. House of Representatives from Tennessee's 4th congressional district July 24, 1866 - March 3, 1867	Succeeded by James Mullins
