= Samuel Escue Tillman =

Career military educator

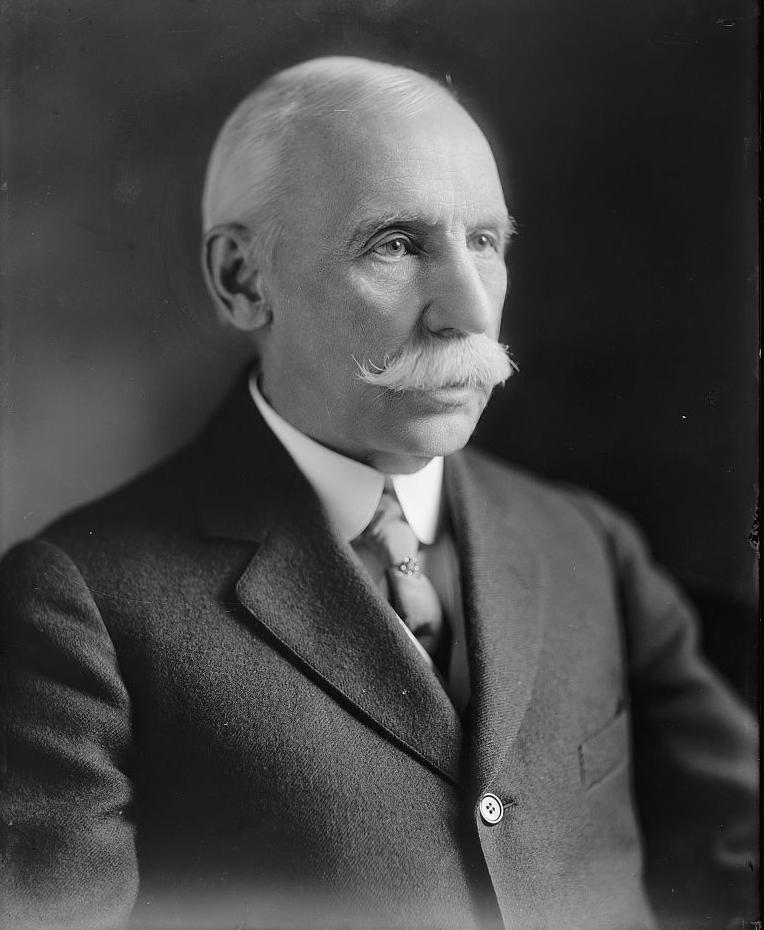
- Samuel E. Tillman, photographed after retirement by Harris & Ewing
- Born: October 2, 1847 near Shelbyville, Tennessee, U.S.
- Died: June 24, 1942 (aged 94); Southampton, New York, U.S.
- Burial place: West Point Cemetery; 41°23′55″N 73°58′3″W
- Military career
- Allegiance: United States of America
- Branch: United States Army
- Service years: 1869–1911, 1917–1919
- Rank: Brigadier General
- Unit: Corps of Engineers
- Commands: Superintendent of the United States Military Academy
- Awards: Distinguished Service Medal

Samuel Escue Tillman (October 2, 1847 – June 24, 1942) was an astronomer, engineer, military educator, and career officer in the United States Army who spent 30 years teaching at the United States Military Academy at West Point, New York. In addition to writing for periodicals on a wide range of subjects and authoring several influential textbooks on chemistry and geology, in 1917 Tillman was recalled from previous mandatory retirement to serve as superintendent of the United States Military Academy for the duration of conflict which became known as World War I.

== Early life ==
Samuel Tillman was born in Bedford County, Tennessee, near modern Shelbyville on October 2, 1847, one of several sons of Lewis Tillman and Mary C. Davidson Tillman. The younger Tillman and his brothers were raised on the family plantation in wartime Tennessee during much of the American Civil War. Tillman left the farm in 1864 to attend Miami University in Oxford, Ohio, but left after a year to accept an at-large appointment to the United States Military Academy in July, 1865, months after the end of the rebellion. Tillman proved an excellent cadet, graduating 3rd out of 39 in the USMA graduating class of 1869. Among his classmates who also served as general officers were Earl Dennison Thomas, William P. Duvall, Charles Morton, and William W. Robinson Jr. Among his prominent classmates who did not attain general's rank were Eric Bergland, Arthur Sherburne Hardy, John Gregory Bourke, and James Ezekiel Porter.

== Military career ==
Tillman spent fifteen months on the frontier at Fort Riley, Kansas, then returned to the academy for a period as assistant professor of mathematics. Originally commissioned as an artillery officer, he transferred to the Army Corps of Engineers on June 10, 1872. The following years would see Tillman alternating tours between teaching assignments at the academy and surveying the last unexplored portions of the American West. In addition to involvement in expeditions to explore and map parts of the western states of Arizona, California, Idaho, Montana, Nevada, New Mexico, and Utah, Tillman was detailed for a year as assistant astronomer on the national expedition to Northern Tasmania observe the Transit of Venus. In late 1878, Tillman became the sixtieth of the founding members of Washington, D.C.'s Cosmos Club, but resigned in 1881, after he was given permanent assignment at West Point as professor of chemistry, mineralogy, and geology.

Lieutenant Tillman sat on the board of inquiry concerning the alleged assault by cadets on Johnson Chesnut Whittaker. As full professor Tillman was given responsibility for redesigning the physical science curriculum at the academy; U.S. Army Adjutant General Richard C. Drum ordered Tillman and fellow academy instructor George L. Andrews to visit Harvard, Yale, and other American institutions of higher learning to investigate new educational technologies in order to incorporate them into the curriculum.

The next thirty years of Tillman's life were devoted to writing and teaching at the academy. He wrote for popular periodicals like Popular Science and Cosmopolitan and literary journals like American Monthly Review of Reviews. Tillman authored several science textbooks for use by academy instructors, notably the physics work Elementary Lessons in Heat (1889), Descriptive General Chemistry (1897), and A text-book of Important Minerals and Rocks (1900). He was responsible for the academy's mineralogical and geological cabinet. Tillman also wrote a series of memoirs which have been featured in the works of Miami University historian Dwight L. Smith.

Toward the end of his career, Tillman was presented with an honorary degree from Yale University in 1906. In 1911, after 44 years of active U.S. Army service in the classroom and field, Tillman was retired. He spent some time in Italy, leaving at the outbreak of World War I; Tillman settled in Princeton, New Jersey, continuing to write, presenting A Review of West Point's History before the New York Historical Society in October, 1915.

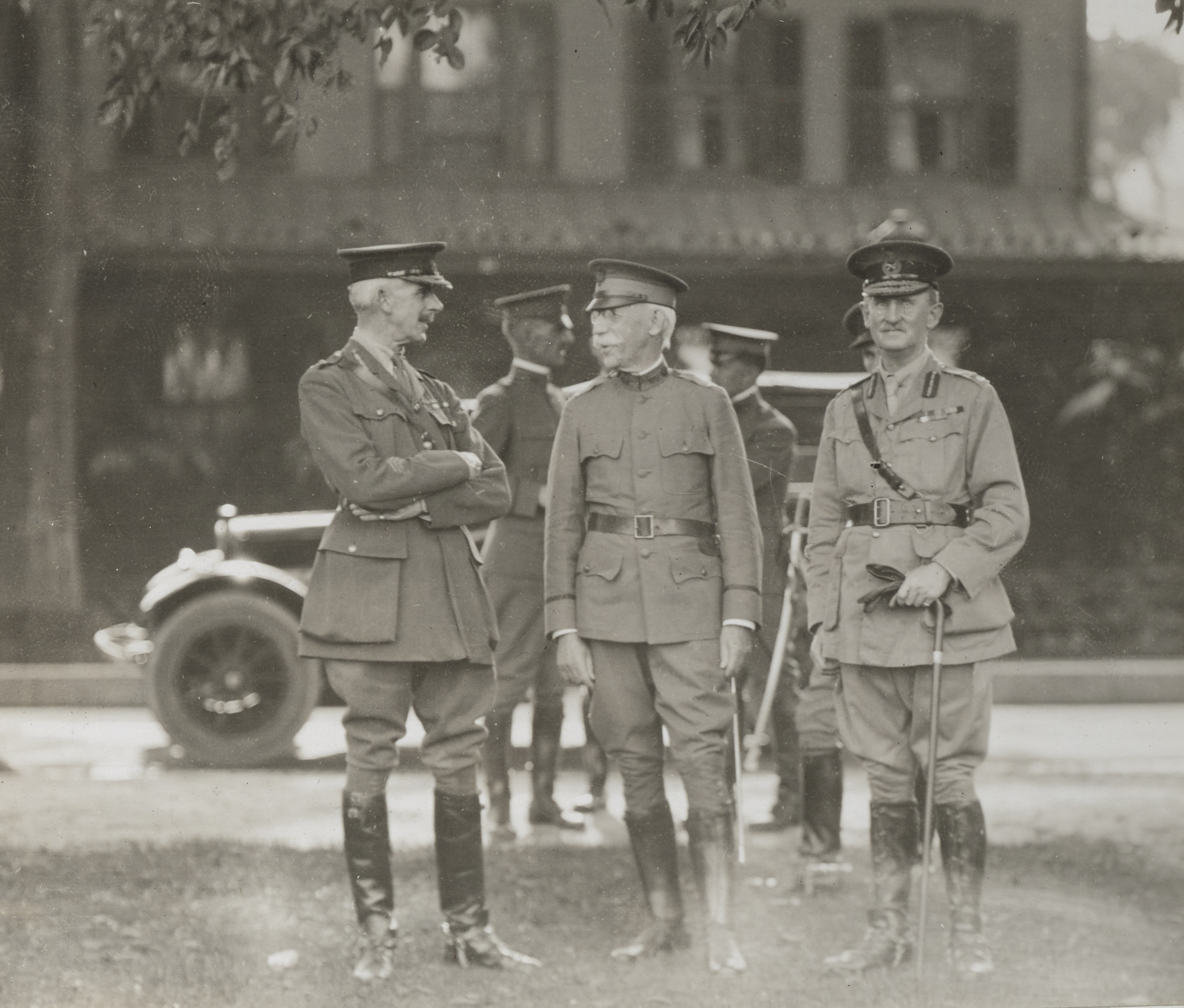
Visit to West Point of the British Mission, General Headlen. Stood in the center is the superintendent of West Point, Colonel Samuel E. Tillman.

In early 1917, shortly before the American entry into World War I, the army was preparing for its involvement in the war raging in Europe on the Western Front, and all academy instructors who could be detailed were assigned to field commands. This left an understrength USMA teaching staff not only doing "double duty," but also teaching in officer training schools during the summer. When Colonel Tillman was recalled from retirement to serve as USMA superintendent in June, 1917, the cadet class of 1917 had already graduated two months early and been assigned to wartime posts. The USMA class of 1918 graduated in the autumn of 1917, the classes of 1919 and 1920 graduated in June 1918, and the cadet class of 1921 were graduated before the Armistice with Germany was signed. "On November 2, 1918, the Corps of Cadets consisted of members of the Fourth Class only." Tillman had seen the graduation of an entire corps of cadets before he was again retired, this time with promotion to brigadier general and the Army Distinguished Service Medal for his wartime service. The citation for his Army DSM reads:

The President of the United States of America, authorized by Act of Congress, July 9, 1918, takes pleasure in presenting the Army Distinguished Service Medal to Brigadier General Samuel E. Tillman, United States Army, for exceptionally meritorious and distinguished services to the Government of the United States, in a duty of great responsibility during World War I, as Superintendent, U.S. Military Academy, during the period of the emergency from 1917 to 1918.

While Superintendent of West Point, Tillman refused repeated requests to add military aviation to the curriculum.

== Legacy ==
Samuel Escue Tillman died June 24, 1942, at the home of his daughter, Katherine Tillman Martin, in Southampton, New York, and was buried at West Point Cemetery two days later. According to his obituary, he was survived by one brother, A.H. Tillman, who served for a time as United States district attorney in Washington D.C. Four brothers had preceded him in death, among them James Davidson Tillman, who had served as a Confederate colonel and postwar as U.S. Minister to Ecuador.

"The airship is very much as reported by The News ... It consists of a cigar-shaped body about 60 feet in length ... The motive power is an immense wheel at each end, in appearance much like a metallic windmill. It is driven by an immense electric engine, which derives its power from storage batteries."

The crewmen – earthlings, as it sadly turned out – gave their names as S.E. Tilman and A.E. Dolbear. They explained that they were on a test cruise in compliance with a contract they held with certain New York capitalists.

"They are confident that they have achieved a great success and that within a short time navigation of the air will be an assured fact," said the farmer."

— C.L. McIlhany, quoted in Dallas Morning News, February 4, 2008

In 1885, when Henry Tureman Allen was exploring the Copper River in the new U.S. territory of Alaska, he named a discovered peak after Tillman, his academy professor, but the discovery proved to be one major error in the survey, Allen mistaking either Mount Wrangell or Mount Sanford for the non-existent Mount Tillman.

In 2008, Kent Biffle of the Dallas Morning News reported receiving newspaper clippings from a local lawyer and historian on the subject of UFO sightings in Stephenville, Texas. Apparently in 1897, widespread newspaper reports of a cigar-shaped flying object started to circulate in the Midwest and Southwest. Responding to sightings previously reported in the Morning News, on April 17, 1897, one respected Erath County farmer, C.L. McIlhany discovered such a craft had landed on his property, and reported two human operators, a pilot and an engineer, who gave their names as "S.E. Tilman" and "A.E. Dolbear." The two operators performed minor repairs on their electrically powered lighter-than-air craft, then again flew away.

== Selected works by Tillman ==
- Tillman, Samuel Escue (1990). Smith, Dwight La Vern (ed.). The Kansas Frontier, 1869-1870: Lt. Samuel Tillman's First Tour of Duty. Kansas State Historical Society.
- Tillman, Samuel (May 21, 1878). Wheeler, George W. (ed.). Annual report upon the geographical explorations and surveys west of the one hundredth meridian... Geographical Surveys West of the 100th Meridian. Washington, D.C.: Government Printing Office. p. 107.
- Tillman, Samuel Escue (1892) [1889]. Elementary Lessons in Heat (2 ed.). Philadelphia, Pennsylvania: J.B. Lippincott. pp. 160.
- Tillman, Samuel E. (1893). "Fossil Forests of the Yellowstone". The Popular Science Monthly. Vol. 43. New York: D. Appleton. p. 301.
- Tillman, Samuel Escue (1911) [1897]. Descriptive General Chemistry (4 ed.). New York: John Wiley & Sons. p. 459.
- Tillman, Samuel Escue (1903) [1900]. A text-book of Important Minerals and Rocks (2 ed.). New York: John Wiley & Sons. p. 176.
- Tillman, Samuel E. (1902). "West Point and Its Centenary". American Monthly Review of Reviews. Vol. 26. New York: Review of Reviews. p. 45.

Military offices
Preceded by John Biddle	Superintendents of the United States Military Academy; 1917–1919	Succeeded by Douglas MacArthur
