= Amos Dolbear =

American physicist

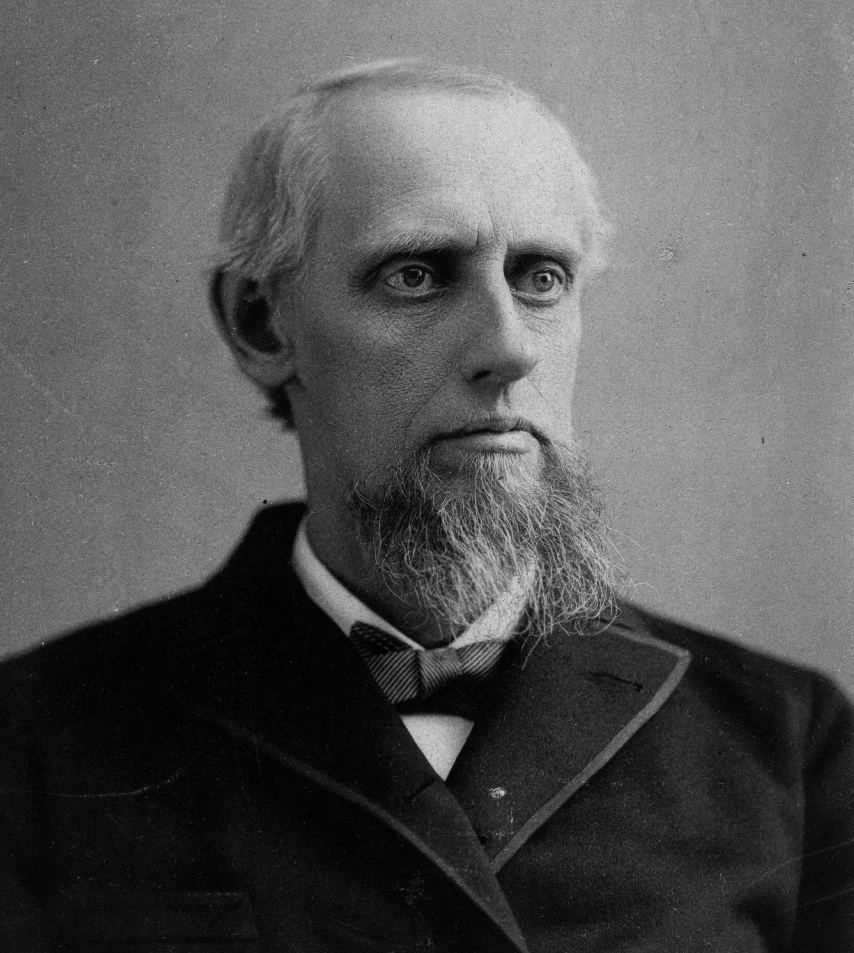
- Amos Dolbear, c. 1880
- Born: November 10, 1837; Norwich, Connecticut
- Died: February 23, 1910 (aged 72); Medford, Massachusetts
- Known for: Dolbear's law

Amos Emerson Dolbear (/ˈeɪmɒs ˈɛmərsən ˈdɒlbɛər/; November 10, 1837 – February 23, 1910) was an American physicist and inventor. Dolbear researched electrical spark conversion into sound waves and electrical impulses. He was a professor at University of Kentucky in Lexington from 1868 until 1874. In 1874 he became the chair of the physics department at Tufts University in Medford, Massachusetts. He is known for his 1882 invention of a system for transmitting telegraph signals without wires. In 1899 his patent for it was purchased in an unsuccessful attempt to interfere with Guglielmo Marconi's wireless telegraphy patents in the United States.

== Biography ==
Amos Dolbear was born in Norwich, Connecticut, on November 10, 1837. He was a graduate of Ohio Wesleyan University, in Delaware, Ohio. While a student there, he had made a "talking telegraph" and invented a receiver containing two features of the modern telephone: a permanent magnet and a metallic diaphragm that he made from a tintype. He invented the first telephone receiver with a permanent magnet in 1865, 11 years before Alexander Graham Bell patented his model. Later, Dolbear couldn't prove his claim, so Bell kept the patent. Dolbear lost his case before the U. S. Supreme Court, (Dolbear et al. v. American Bell Telephone Company). The June 18, 1881, edition of Scientific American reported:

[...] had he been observant of patent office formalities, it is possible that the speaking telephone, now so widely credited to Mr. Bell would be garnered among his own laurels.

In 1876, Dolbear patented a magneto electric telephone. He patented a static telephone in 1879.

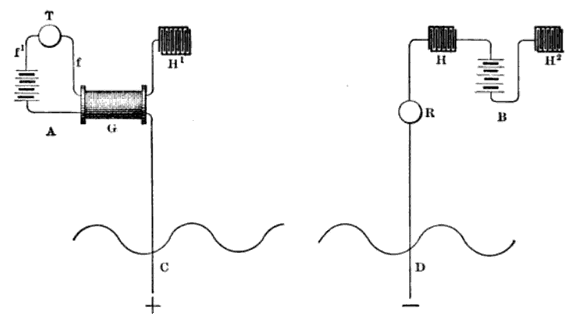
Circuit of Dolbear's wireless telephone, from his 1882 patent. The transmitter (A) consisted of an electrostatic microphone (T) and battery in the primary circuit of an induction coil (G). One side of the high voltage secondary winding is earthed (C) the other side connected to an elevated capacitance (H1). The receiver (B) consists of a battery, earphone (R) and capacitor (H) connected in series between an elevated capacitor (H2) and earth (D).

In 1883, Dolbear was able to communicate over a distance of a quarter of a mile without wires in the Earth. His device relied on conduction in the ground, which was different from later radio transmissions that used electromagnetic radiation. He received a U.S. patent for a wireless telegraph in March of that year. His set-up used phones grounded by metal rods poked into the earth. His transmission range was at least as much as a half a mile and he received a patent for this device, U.S. patent 350,299, in 1886. (He did not patent his system in Europe.)

In 1899, The New England Wireless Telegraph and Telephone Company, a subsidiary of the American Wireless Telephone and Telegraph Company, purchased Dolbear's 1886 patent, and filed a suit against Marconi for infringement. However, in March 1901, a United States Circuit Court dismissed the suit. In April 1902, American Wireless petitioned Congress to extend the 1886 patent by ten years, but was unsuccessful, so it duly expired on October 4, 1903. In 1905, the New York Circuit Court further noted that the Dolbear patent was "inoperative, and that, even if operative, it operates by virtue of radically different electrical laws and phenomena" than the radio signaling used by Marconi.

In 1868 Dolbear (while a professor at Bethany College) invented the electrostatic telephone. He also invented the opeidoscope (an instrument for visualizing vibration of sound waves, using a mirror mounted on a membrane) and a system of incandescent lighting. He authored several books, articles, and pamphlets, and was recognized for his contributions to science at both the Paris Exposition in 1881 and the Crystal Palace Exposition in 1882.

In 1897, Dolbear published an article "The Cricket as a Thermometer" that noted the correlation between the ambient temperature and the rate at which crickets chirp. The formula expressed in that article is sometimes known as Dolbear's law although the relationship of chirp rate with temperature is affected by numerous other factors.

In 1899, after the demonstration by Ernest A. Hummel of the telediagraph, an apparatus allowing the transmission of pictures by wire, Dolbear claimed to have invented such an apparatus in 1864 (Norwich Bulletin, 26 April 1899).

He died at his home in Medford on February 23, 1910.

In 2008, Kent Biffle of the Dallas Morning News reported receiving newspaper clippings from a local lawyer and historian on the subject of UFO sightings in Stephenville, Texas. Apparently in 1897, widespread newspaper reports of a cigar-shaped flying object started to circulate in the Midwest and Southwest. Responding to sightings previously reported in the Morning News, on April 17, 1897, one respected Erath County farmer, C.L. McIlhany discovered such a craft had landed on his property, and reported two human operators, a pilot and an engineer, who gave their names as "S.E. Tilman" and "A.E. Dolbear." The two operators performed minor repairs on their electrically powered lighter-than-air craft, then again flew away.

== Publications ==
=== Books ===
- Dolbear, A. E. The Art of Projecting: A manual of experimentation in physics, chemistry, and natural history, with the porte lumière and magic lantern, Boston, Lee and Shepard, 1877
- Dolbear, A. E. The Telephone, Boston, Lee and Shepard, 1877
- Dolbear, A. E. The Telephone and how to make it, London, Sampson Lowe, 1878
- Dolbear, A. E. Matter, Ether, and Motion, Boston, Lee and Shepard, 1892
- Dolbear, A. E. First Principles of Natural Philosophy, Boston, Ginn and Co., 1897
- Dolbear, A. E. Modes of Motion: Mechanical conceptions of physical phenomena, Boston, Lee and Shepard, 1897

=== Journal articles ===
- "The Cricket as a Thermometer". The American Naturalist, Vol. 31, No. 371 (November 1897), pp. 970–971. Published by The University of Chicago Press for The American Society of Naturalists

=== Patents ===
- Apparatus for transmitting sound by electricity U.S. patent 239,742 April 5, 1881.
