= Edward Isaac Golladay =

American politician (1830–1897)

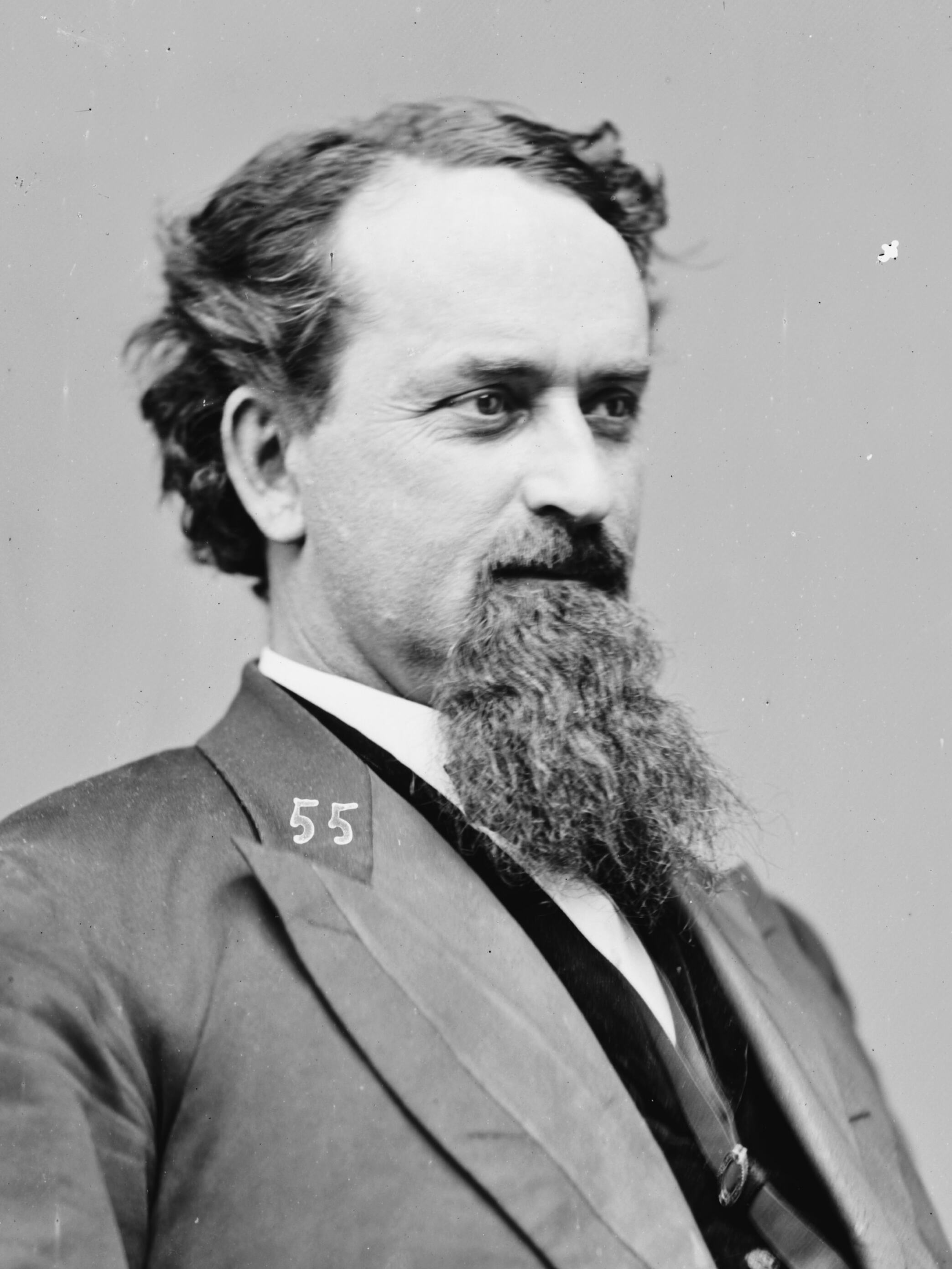

Member of the U.S. House of Representatives from Tennessee's 5th district
- In office March 4, 1871 – March 3, 1873
- Preceded by: William F. Prosser
- Succeeded by: Horace Harrison

Member of the Tennessee House of Representatives
- In office 1857-1858

Personal details
- Born: September 9, 1830 Lebanon, Tennessee
- Died: July 11, 1897 (aged 66) Columbia
- Party: Democratic
- Spouse: Lucinda Louise Cossitt Golladay
- Children: Fanny C. Golladay
- Education: Cumberland University
- Profession: lawyer; politician

Edward Isaac Golladay (September 9, 1830 – July 11, 1897) was an American politician and a member of the United States House of Representatives for Tennessee's 5th congressional district.

== Biography ==
Edward Golladay was born in Lebanon, Tennessee in Wilson County on September 9, 1830. He attended the common schools and graduated from the literary department of Cumberland University at Lebanon, Tennessee in 1848, and from Cumberland School of Law in 1849. (Note: Cumberland University records indicate that he graduated from the literary department with a Bachelor of Arts degree in 1849 but never received an LL.B. degree from the law department.) He married the Lou Cossitt who was the daughter of the Reverend Franceway R. Cossitt, the first President of Cumberland University.

== Career ==
Admitted to the bar in 1849, Golladay commenced practice in Lebanon. He was elected to the Tennessee House of Representatives in 1857 and 1858. He was also a presidential elector on the Constitutional-Union ticket of Bell and Everett in 1860.

Golladay enlisted in the 38th Tennessee Infantry Regiment at Camp Abington and was elected to the rank of captain. On 26 October 1861, he was elected to the rank of lieutenant-colonel, and served in the Confederate Army as a colonel. Edward was captured by Union forces in November 1863. He was paroled and freed after he signed an agreement that he would not engage in further rebellion against the United States Government.

Elected as a Democrat to the Forty-second Congress, Golladay served from March 4, 1871, to March 3, 1873. He was an unsuccessful candidate for re-election in 1872 to the Forty-third Congress, and resumed the practice of law in Lebanon and Nashville.

== Death ==
Golladay died in Columbia, South Carolina while on a visit to his daughter, Fanny, on July 11, 1897 (age 66 years, 305 days). He is interred at Cedar Grove Cemetery in Lebanon. His brother, Jacob Golladay, was a U.S. representative from Kentucky.

== Notes ==
U.S. House of Representatives
Preceded by William Farrand Prosser	Member of the U.S. House of Representatives from Tennessee's 5th congressional district March 4, 1871 – March 3, 1873	Succeeded by Horace Harrison
