= 38th Tennessee Infantry Regiment =

- Active: September 23, 1863 - May 1, 1865
- Country: Confederate States of America
- Allegiance: Confederate States Army
- Branch: Infantry
- Type: Regiment
- Engagements: Battle of Shiloh; Siege of Corinth; Battle of Perryville; Battle of Franklin; Atlanta Campaign; Battle of Rocky Face Ridge; Battle of Peachtree Creek; Battle of Jonesborough; Carolinas Campaign

Commanders
- Notable commanders: Colonel John C. Carter; Lieutenant Colonel Andrew D. Gwynne; Lieutenant Colonel Edward I. Golladay; Major Hamilton W. Cotter; Major Hardeman A. Abington

The 38th Regiment, Tennessee Infantry was an infantry regiment from Tennessee that served with the Confederate States Army in the American Civil War. Notable battles that the regiment has fought in include Shiloh and Chickamauga.

== Organization ==
The regiment was organized on September 23, 1863, at Camp Abington, Tennessee. When the regiment was organized, there weren't any arms available, so General W.H. Carroll, unable to comply with General Samuel Cooper's order, proceeded to join General Felix Zollicoffer. On November 12, Carroll reported that the regiment was armed with shotguns, country rifles, and old muskets.

Companies of the regiment
Company	Moniker	Recruitment Location	Captains
A	Sumter Grays	Memphis, Shelby County	Hamilton W. Colter
B	The Gayaso Guards	Memphis, Shelby County	Edward F. Lee
C	Jeff Davis Guards	Madison County	B.H Holland
D	None	Shelby County	H. A. Abbington
E	None	Wilson County	Job Umphlet
F	None	Shelby County	James C. Thrasher
G	The Tuscaloosa Plough Boys	Tuscaloosa County, Alabama	James J. Mayfield
H	None	Georgia	T. G. Cook
I	None	Shelby County	W. B. Wright
K	None	Memphis and Shelby County	Allen B. Lovejoy

== Service ==
=== 1861 ===
The regiment was ordered to Chattanooga on November 14, and from there, Colonel Looney dispatched 500 men to capture William Clift, who was a leader of a band of Union sympathizers in East Tennessee.

By December 9, 1861, the regiment moved to Knoxville, having a strength of over 988 men, but only having 250 firearms, with at least 50 in working condition, due to the firearms being deemed "utterly worthless, the regiment wasn't permitted to take part in the Battle of Fishing Creek.

=== 1862 ===
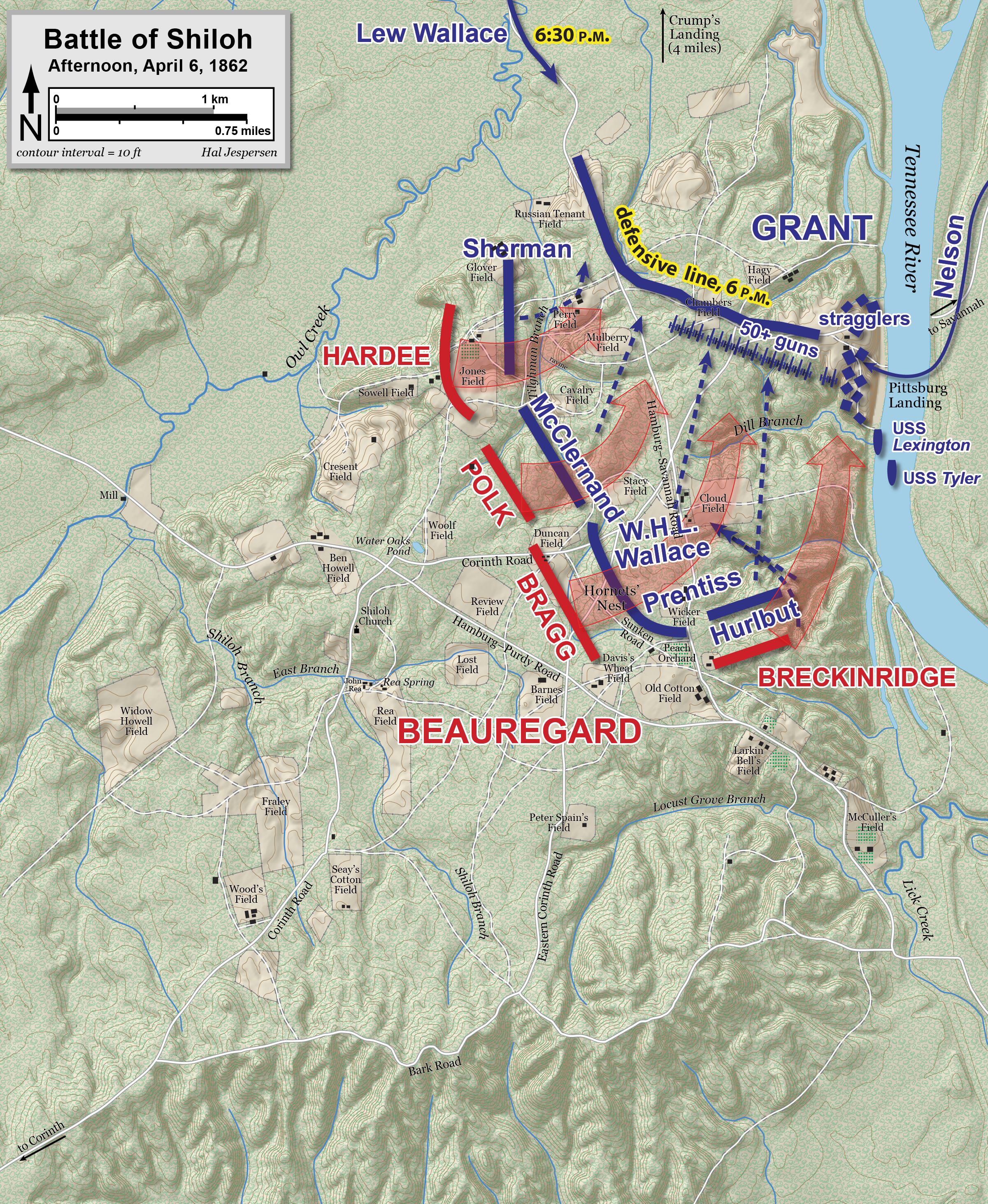
Battle of Shiloh, April 6

In early 1862, General Albert S. Johnston ordered all the men from the 38th Tennessee and 43rd Tennessee forward And on February 8, the Confederate Secretary of War Judah P. Benjamin reported that he had sent 800 muskets to Memphis for the 38th Tennessee. On the same day, General Leonidas Polk sent six companies of the 38th for guard duty at a bridge over the Memphis-Charleston railroad, near Corinth, where they repelled multiple advances from Union gunboats.

By March 9, 1862, the regiment was fully assembled at Corinth, by companies C and I, who were detached to form the 5th Alabama Infantry Regiment, and were attached to Walker's Brigade of Daniel Ruggles' Division. During the Battle of Shiloh (April 6-7), the regiment was assigned to Preston Pond's Brigade and led a charge against Benjamin Prentiss's 6th Division, resulting in the capture of an artillery battery and 1,000 prisoners taken. At 5.30 PM, the regiment assisted in the captured of the 12th Iowa, while Looney was given a sword by Captain Edgington. The regiment would be complimented by Colonel Pond and General Leonidas Polk for their distinction during the battle, where they lost 65 casualties.

Following the battle, on April 22, the brigade's assignment was rapidly changed, its commander, Pond, was replaced by J.M Hawes, and the 38th, alongside other regiments, would be reported to Ruggles' Brigade of Cheatham's Division, On May 9, the regiment, now attached to Colonel James F. Fagan, was present in a skirmish at Farmington, Mississippi, but weren't engaged. The regiment would later take part in the Siege of Corinth, fighting specifically on the Farmington Road on May 28, just before the Confederate evacuation to Tupelo.

On August 20, 1862, the 38th was assigned to Donelson's Brigade of Cheatham's Division, and would take part in the Kentucky Campaign and would fight at the Battle of Perryville, losing 43 as casualties.

=== 1863 ===
In late October 1863, the regiment moved to Charleston, Tennessee, for guard duty at the Hiwassee River Bridge. Cut off by advancing Union forces following the Battle of Missionary Ridge, the 38th burned the bridges at Charleston and Loudon to prevent pursuit and linked up with Longstreet's forces in East Tennessee.

=== 1864 ===
The 38th Tennessee would take part in the Battle of Franklin (November 30), during which, General Carter was mortally wounded, after the battle, Wright's Brigade would be disbanded, later reassigned to Strahl's Brigade in December 1864.

The regiment would later move to Dalton, Georgia in February 1864, and throughout summer, the 38th took part in the Atlanta Campaign from the Battle of Rocky Face Ridge to the Battle of Jonesborough.

=== 1865 ===
On April 9, 1865, the 38th was merged to form the 3rd Consolidated Tennessee Infantry Regiment under Colonel James D. Tillman, the regiment would surrender and be paroled at Greensboro, North Carolina on May 1, 1865, with only a handful remaining.

== Commanders ==
- Colonel John C. Carter
- Lieutenant Colonel Andrew D. Gwynne
- Lieutenant Colonel Edward I. Golladay
- Major Hamilton W. Cotter
- Major Hardeman A. Abington

== See also ==
- List of Tennessee Confederate Civil War units
