= Horace Harrison =

American judge

Horace Harrison Harrison
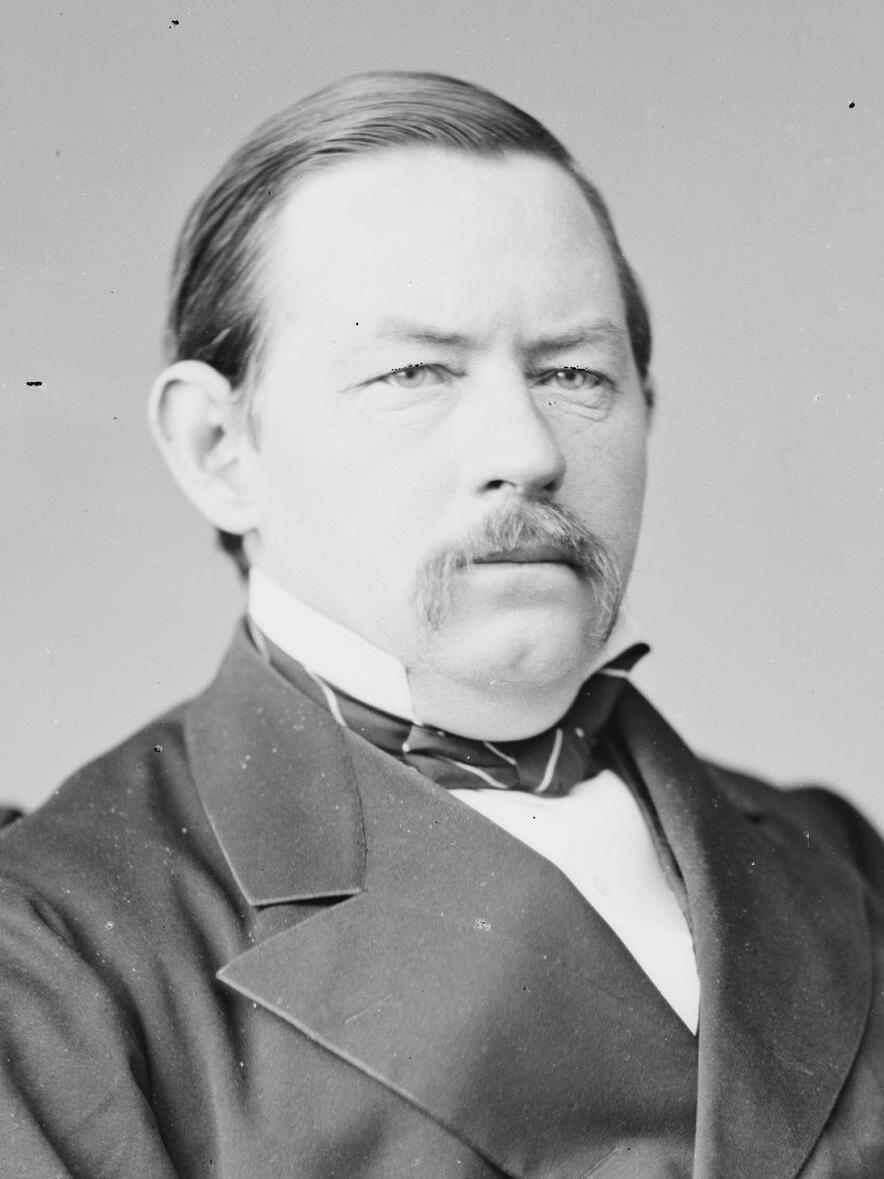

Member of the U.S. House of Representatives from Tennessee's 5th district
- In office March 4, 1873 – March 3, 1875
- Preceded by: Edward I. Golladay
- Succeeded by: John M. Bright

Personal details
- Born: August 7, 1829 Lebanon, Tennessee
- Died: December 20, 1885 (aged 56) Nashville, Tennessee
- Party: Republican
- Profession: lawyer; politician; judge

Horace Harrison Harrison (August 7, 1829 – December 20, 1885) was an American politician and a member of the United States House of Representatives for the 5th congressional district of Tennessee.

He was the last Republican to serve as representative from Tennessee’s 5th congressional district, or to represent a significant portion of Nashville, until Andy Ogles was elected in 2022.

== Biography ==
Harrison was born 7 August 1829 in Lebanon, Tennessee in Wilson County to Joshua Stone Harrison and Judith Coleman Turner. He attended Carroll Academy and completed the course in ancient classics under a private instructor. He moved with his parents to McMinnville, Warren County, Tennessee in 1841.

== Career ==
In Warren County, Harrison was clerk of the county court, master of the chancery court, and register of deeds. In 1851 and 1852, he was clerk of the Tennessee Senate. He studied law, was admitted to the bar in 1857, and commenced practice in McMinnville. He moved to Nashville in 1859 and continued the practice of law. He served as United States Attorney from 1863 to 1866 and was a chancellor of the Nashville division in 1866. He was a judge of the Tennessee Supreme Court in 1867 and 1868, one of the judges serving on the highly partisan "apocryphal" court, which was in place in Tennessee between the end of the American Civil War and the enactment of the Constitution of 1870. The justices who served on this court "without exception, were bitter partisans" who "had all been Union men, and... took the partisan view of all questions growing out of the war". Of this group, Harrison is described as one of several "of mediocre ability, who could not by possibility have reached a position of such importance in ordinary times". He was again a United States district attorney in 1872 and 1873.

Harrison was elected as a Republican to the Forty-third Congress, but was unsuccessful as a candidate for re-election. He served from March 4, 1873 to March 3, 1875. He was the last Republican to represent Tennessee's 5th congressional district until Andy Ogles was elected in 2022, following redistricting that led to the district being favorable to the Republicans. He was a delegate to the Republican National Convention in 1880. He was a member of the state legislature in 1880 and 1881.

== Death ==
On December 20, 1885, at the age of 56 years, 135 days, Harrison died in Nashville, Tennessee. He is interred at Mount Olivet Cemetery.

U.S. House of Representatives
Preceded by Edward I. Golladay	Member of the U.S. House of Representatives from Tennessee's 5th congressional district 1873–1875	Succeeded by John M. Bright
