= Lewis Tillman =

American politician

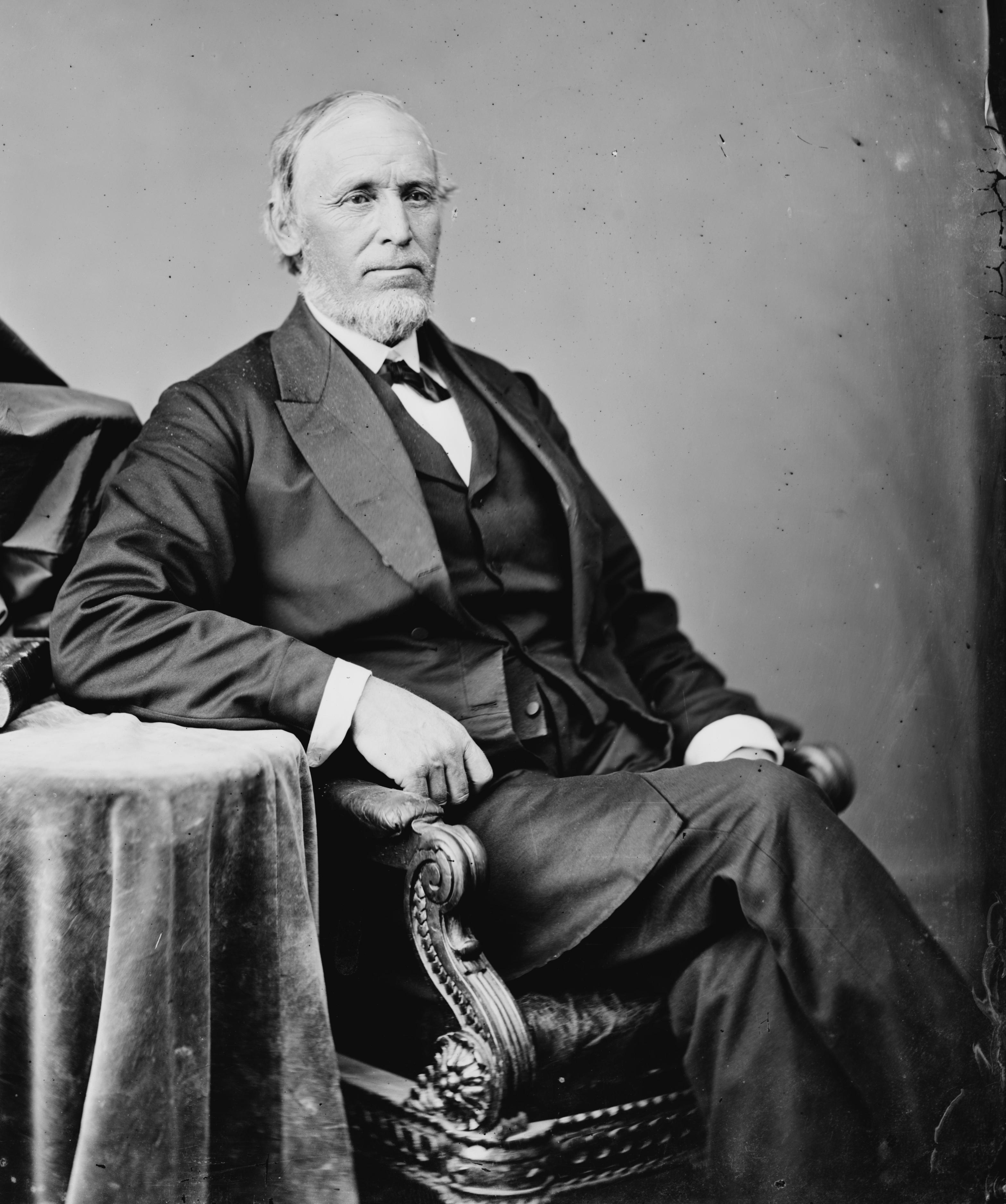

Member of the U.S. House of Representatives from Tennessee's 4th district
- In office March 4, 1869 – March 3, 1871
- Preceded by: James Mullins
- Succeeded by: John M. Bright

Personal details
- Born: August 18, 1816 Shelbyville, Tennessee
- Died: May 3, 1886 (aged 69) Shelbyville, Tennessee
- Party: Republican
- Spouse: Mary Catherine Davidson Tillman
- Children: James Davidson Tillman; John Tillman; Lewis Tillman Jr.; Samuel Escue Tillman; George Newton Tillman; Mary Catherine Tillman; Harriet Almeda Tillman Brannan; Edwin Hord Tillman; John Marshall Tillman; Abram Martin Tillman
- Profession: soldier, farmer, newspaper editor

Lewis Tillman (August 18, 1816 – May 3, 1886) was an American politician and a member of the United States House of Representatives for the 4th congressional district of Tennessee.

== Biography ==
Tillman was born near Shelbyville, Tennessee in Bedford County. He attended the common schools and pursued an academic course.

== Career ==
Tillman served in the Seminole War as a private and engaged in agricultural pursuits. He was a circuit court clerk of Bedford County from 1852 to 1860. He was a colonel of the state militia before the Civil War and the editor of a newspaper in Shelbyville. From 1865 to 1869, he was a clerk and master of the chancery court.

Elected as a member of the Republican Party to the Forty-first Congress, Tillman served from March 4, 1869, to March 3, 1871, but was not a candidate for renomination in 1870. He returned to agricultural pursuits.

== Family ==
Tillman was the son of John Tillman and his wife Rachel Povall Martin. His uncle, Barclay Martin, also served as a U.S. congressman.

On August 27, 1840, Tillman married Mary Catherine Davidson. They had eight sons and two daughters, seven of whom survived to adulthood.

Their eldest child, James Davidson Tillman, was a Confederate colonel and postwar served as a Democratic member of the Tennessee Senate and was appointed U.S. Minister to Ecuador by President Grover Cleveland. His brother, Brigadier General Samuel Escue Tillman, was a West Point graduate who served as the Academy's Superintendent during World War I.

Another son, George Newton Tillman, was a Republican member of the Tennessee House of Representatives who was later defeated by the Democratic candidate in both the 1896 and 1908 Tennessee gubernatorial elections. His brother, Commander Edwin Hord Tillman, was a Naval Academy graduate who became a noted hydrographic surveyor and later served as superintendent of the New York Nautical School.

== Death ==
Tillman died in Shelbyville on May 3, 1886. He was interred in Willow Mount Cemetery.

U.S. House of Representatives
Preceded by James Mullins	Member of the U.S. House of Representatives from Tennessee's 4th congressional district March 4, 1869 – March 3, 1871	Succeeded by John M. Bright
