= Jacob Golladay =

American politician (1819–1887)

Jacob Shall Golladay
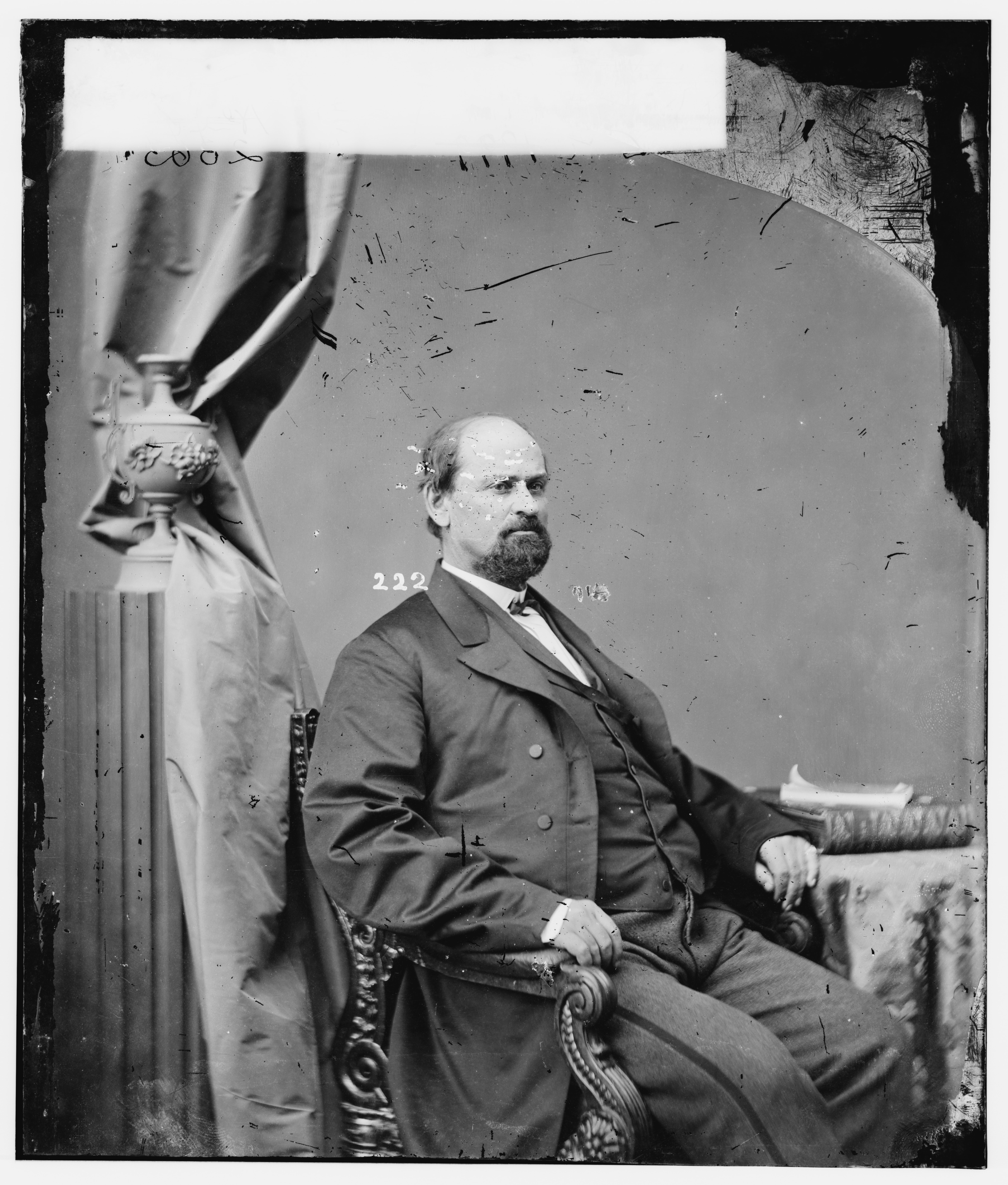
- Jacob Shall Golladay

Member of the U.S. House of Representatives from Kentucky's 3rd district
- In office December 5, 1867 – February 28, 1870
- Preceded by: Elijah Hise
- Succeeded by: Joseph Lewis

Member of the Kentucky Senate from the 4th district
- In office September 1853 – August 6, 1855
- Preceded by: James W. Irwin
- Succeeded by: George T. Edwards

Member of the Kentucky House of Representatives from Logan County
- In office August 4, 1851 – August 1, 1853
- Preceded by: Burwell C. Ritter; John F. Todd
- Succeeded by: Drury W. Poor

Personal details
- Born: January 19, 1819 Lebanon, Tennessee
- Died: May 20, 1887 (aged 68) Logan County, Kentucky
- Resting place: Maple Grove Cemetery
- Party: Whig; Constitutional Unionist; Democrat
- Spouse: Elizabeth Cheatham
- Relations: Brother of Edward Isaac Golladay
- Profession: Politician, Lawyer

Jacob Shall Golladay (January 19, 1819 – May 20, 1887) was a 19th-century politician from Kentucky. He served in the Kentucky House of Representatives and Senate, followed by two terms as a United States representative for the 3rd congressional district (1867 to 1870). His brother Edward Isaac Golladay also became an attorney and served as a U.S. congressman from Tennessee.

== Early life ==
Jacob Golladay was born in 1819 in Lebanon, Tennessee. His father Isaac was a descendant of French Huguenots who emigrated to Virginia about 1700 from Germany after escaping religious persecution against Protestants in France. The spelling of the family name is likely an anglicised version of the French surname "Gallaudet". His mother was of German ancestry, with immigrant ancestors who arrived later in the 18th century.

In 1815 the Golladay family moved to Lebanon, Tennessee, where both Jacob and his younger brother Edward were born. After attending public school, Jacob moved in 1838 to Logan County, Kentucky (later organized as Todd County), where he worked for seven years in a wholesale store. In 1845 he settled in Allensville, on the southern border of the state, where he started a practice as a lawyer.

In 1846 Golladay married Elizabeth Cheatham, step-daughter of Prof. VV. K. Bolling, of Nashville, Tennessee, who became president of the American Medical Association. They had five children: Melissa, John Jacob, Archer, Bowling, and Elizabeth. Only Bowling survived to adulthood; he was educated at Vanderbilt University in Nashville. All of the children are buried beside their parents.

== Politics ==
In 1851 Golladay won election as a Whig to the Kentucky House of Representatives representing Allensville. He resigned in 1853 to take up a seat in the Kentucky Senate, stepping down in 1855 after a single term.

In 1860, Golladay was chosen as an elector for Constitutional Union Party presidential candidate John Bell and running mate Edward Everett for the Kentucky's 3rd congressional district. This party favored preservation of the Union, but urged compromise and peaceful solutions.

On December 5, 1867, he was elected as a Democrat to the Fortieth Congress, representing Kentucky's 3rd congressional district following the death of the previous Representative, Elijah Hise. He was re-elected to the Forty-first Congress but retired on February 28, 1870, before the end of his term.

== Later life ==
After Congress, Golladay resumed his legal practice in Allensville, Kentucky. He died near Russellville in 1887 and was buried next to his son in Maple Grove Cemetery.

U.S. House of Representatives
Preceded by Elijah Hise	United States Representative, Kentucky's 3rd district 1867–1870	Succeeded by Joseph Lewis
