= Richard Warner (Tennessee politician) =

American politician (1835–1915)

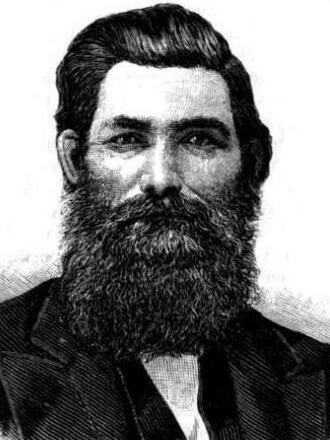
- From 1882's Public Men of To-Day

Member of the U.S. House of Representatives from Tennessee's 5th district
- In office March 4, 1881 – March 3, 1885
- Preceded by: John M. Bright
- Succeeded by: James D. Richardson

Member of the Tennessee House of Representatives
- In office 1879-1881

Personal details
- Born: September 19, 1835 Chapel Hill, Tennessee, U.S.
- Died: March 4, 1915 (aged 79) Nashville, Tennessee, U.S.
- Party: Democratic
- Education: Cumberland School of Law
- Profession: lawyer; politician

Richard Warner (September 19, 1835 – March 4, 1915) was a U.S. Representative from Tennessee.

== Biography ==
Born near Chapel Hill, Tennessee, Warner attended the public schools and graduated from Cumberland School of Law at Cumberland University, Lebanon, Tennessee, with a Bachelor of Laws degree in 1857. He was admitted to the bar in 1858 and commenced practice in Lewisburg, Tennessee.

== Career ==
Warner served in the Confederate States Army from 1861 to 1865 and, after the end of the Civil War, returned to Lewisburg, Tennessee, to resume the practice of law. He served as delegate to the convention that framed the new constitution of Tennessee in 1870 and served as member of the state house of representatives from 1879 to 1881.

Elected as a Democrat to the Forty-seventh and Forty-eighth Congresses, Warner served from March 4, 1881, to March 3, 1885. He served as chairman of the Committee on Mines and Mining (Forty-eighth Congress). He was an unsuccessful candidate for renomination in 1884, and resumed the practice of law in Lewisburg, Tennessee.

== Death ==
Warner died in Nashville, Tennessee, March 4, 1915, and is interred at Warner Cemetery, near Chapel Hill, Tennessee.

U.S. House of Representatives
Preceded by John M. Bright	Member of the U.S. House of Representatives from Tennessee's 5th congressional district March 4, 1881 – March 3, 1885	Succeeded by James D. Richardson
