= 27th Tennessee Infantry Regiment =

Infantry regiment of the Confederate States Army

- Active: 1861–1865
- Disbanded: April 9, 1865
- Country: Confederate States
- Allegiance: Tennessee
- Branch: Army
- Type: Infantry
- Size: Regiment
- Part of: Maney's Brigade
- Facings: Light blue
- Arms: Enfield rifled muskets; Whitworth rifles
- Battles: American Civil War; Battle of Shiloh; Battle of Perryville; Battle of Stones River; Battle of Chickamauga; Battle of Missionary Ridge; Battle of Kennesaw Mountain; Battle of Franklin; Battle of Nashville; Battle of Bentonville
- Battle honor: Perryville

Commanders
- Commanding officers: Col. Christopher H. Williams †; Col. Alexander W. Caldwell

The 27th Tennessee Infantry Regiment was an infantry formation of the Confederate States Army in the Western Theater of the American Civil War. It was successively commanded by Colonels Christopher H. Williams and Alexander W. Caldwell.

Organized in 1861 with volunteers from western Tennessee, the regiment was assigned to Maney's Brigade, Cheatham's Division, 1st Corps, Army of Tennessee. After sustaining heavy casualties at the battles of Shiloh and Perryville, it was amalgamated with the 1st Tennessee Infantry Regiment.

== History ==
The 27th Tennessee Infantry Regiment was organized on September 10, 1861, at Camp Trenton, from new and existing companies of volunteer infantry. Its 833 men were from the counties of Benton, McNairy, Obion, Henderson, Decatur, Crockett, Weakley, and Carroll. It was furnished arms at Columbus, Kentucky, then fought at Shiloh, Munfordville, and Perryville. The regiment was assigned to Maney's Brigade, Cheatham's Division, 1st Corps, Army of Tennessee. On January 1, 1863, it was amalgamated with the "First Tennessee," resulting in the creation of the 1st and 27th Tennessee Infantry Regiment.

The regiment participated in many conflicts from Murfreesboro to Atlanta, endured Hood's winter operations, and ended the war in North Carolina attached to Palmer's Brigade. It totaled 580 effectives in December 1861, and lost 54 percent of the 350 at Shiloh and 53 percent of the 210 at Perryville. The 1st and 27th Tennessee had 83 casualties of the 457 at Murfreesboro, reported 14 killed and 75 wounded at Chickamauga, and in late 1863, totaled 456 men and 290 arms. Only a remnant surrendered with the 1st Consolidated Tennessee Infantry Regiment on April 26, 1865.

== Regimental order of battle ==
Units of the 27th Tennessee Infantry Regiment included:

- Company A
- Company B
- Company C
- Company D (Felix Rebels)
- Company E (Decatur Tigers)
- Company F
- Company G
- Company H
- Company I
- Company K (Henderson County Sharpshooters)

== See also ==
- List of Confederate units from Tennessee

== Bibliography ==
- Allardice, Bruce S. (2008). Confederate Colonels: A Biographical Register. Columbia: University of Missouri Press. ISBN 978-0-8262-1809-4. OCLC 938897182 – via Internet Archive.
- Carroll, John William (1898). "Chapter VIII: My Civil War Experience". Autobiography and Reminiscences of John W. Carroll. Henderson, Tenn. pp. 20–42. OCLC 1039959005. OL 25294194M – via Internet Archive.
- Porter, James D. (1899). Evans, Clement A. (ed.). Confederate Military History. Volume VIII. Atlanta: Confederate Publishing Co. OCLC 1042525133 – via Internet Archive.
- Sanders, Stuart W. (2014). Maney's Confederate Brigade at the Battle of Perryville. Charleston, S.C.: The History Press. ISBN 978-1-62619-264-5. OCLC 866800128.
- Sifakis, Stewart (1992). Compendium of the Confederate Armies: Tennessee. New York: Facts On File, Inc. ISBN 0-8160-2286-0. OCLC 25364094.
- Watkins, Sam. R. (1882). 1861 vs. 1862. "Co. Aytch", Maury Grays, First Tennessee Regiment; or, A Side Show of the Big Show (1st ed.). Nashville, Tenn.: Cumberland Presbyterian Publishing House. OCLC 1596290 – via Internet Archive.
