= Elijah Hise =

American politician and diplomat (1802–1867)

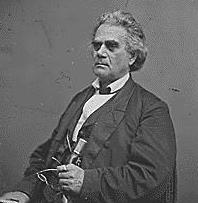

Member of the U.S. House of Representatives from Kentucky's 3rd district
- In office December 3, 1866 – May 8, 1867
- Preceded by: Henry Grider
- Succeeded by: Jacob Golladay

Chief Justice of the Kentucky Court of Appeals
- In office 1852–1854
- Preceded by: James Simpson
- Succeeded by: T.A. Marshall

Justice of the Kentucky Court of Appeals
- In office 1851–1854

United States Chargé d'Affaires to Guatemala
- In office January 31, 1849 – June 23, 1849
- President: James K. Polk
- Preceded by: Charles G. DeWitt
- Succeeded by: Solon Borland

Member of the Kentucky House of Representatives from Logan County
- In office 1829–1830 Serving with James W. Irwin
- Preceded by: multi-member district
- Succeeded by: multi-member district

Personal details
- Born: July 4, 1802 Allegheny County, Pennsylvania
- Died: May 8, 1867 (aged 64) Russellville, Kentucky
- Party: Democratic
- Education: Transylvania University

Elijah Hise (July 4, 1802 – May 8, 1867) was a United States diplomat and U.S. representative from the 3rd district of Kentucky.

== Biography ==
Hise was born on July 4, 1802, in Allegheny County, Pennsylvania, before moving with his parents, Frederick and Nancy (Eckstein) Hise, to Russellville, Kentucky, when young. He completed preparatory studies and then attended Transylvania University, Lexington, Kentucky. He studied law and was admitted to the bar and commenced practice.

Hise was a member of the Kentucky House of Representatives in 1829. He was an unsuccessful Democratic candidate for Lieutenant Governor in 1836. He served as the Chargé d'Affaires to Guatemala, January 31, 1849 – June 23, 1849. In addition, he was the chief justice of the Court of Appeals of Kentucky.

Hise was elected as a Democrat to the Thirty-ninth Congress to fill the vacancy caused by the death of Henry Grider, and he was reelected to the Fortieth Congress. In all he served from December 3, 1866, until his death by suicide on May 8, 1867, in Russellville, Kentucky. He left behind a suicide note in which he rued "the impending disaster and ruin [of the country] in which despotic and unconstitutional rule has involved her." He was buried in Maple Grove Cemetery.

The town of Hiseville, Kentucky, was named in honor of the congressman.

== See also ==
- List of members of the United States Congress who died in office (1790–1899)

U.S. House of Representatives
Preceded by Henry Grider	Member of the U.S. House of Representatives from Kentucky's 3rd congressional district December 3, 1866 – May 8, 1867	Succeeded by Jacob Golladay
Diplomatic posts
Preceded by Charles G. DeWitt	United States Chargé d'Affaires, Guatemala; January 31, 1849 – June 23, 1849	Succeeded by Solon Borland
