= Pillow Flying Artillery =

Pillow Flying Artillery was a Tennessee battery of artillery in the Confederate Army in the early years of the American Civil War. It was mustered into service in Memphis and likely outfitted at Fort Pillow, Tennessee. Also known as Miller's Tennessee Battery, it was reported by Gen. Albert Sidney Johnston as arriving at Bowling Green, KY, from Columbus, KY with an aggregate of 70 men. Records of this battery exist from 1861. The battery is not mentioned in any records after May 1862.

== Organization ==
An unsuccessful attempt was made in May, 1862, to form a regiment of light artillery out of the light artillery batteries which had belonged to the Artillery Corps of Tennessee. Some of the companies (or batteries) were mustered as companies of the First Tennessee Light Artillery Regiment. Some later formed the First Tennessee Light Artillery Battalion, also known as the First Tennessee Heavy Artillery Regiment.

By 31 January 1862 Pillow Flying Artillery was in Colonel J.S. Bowen's Brigade of Floyd's Division, Hardee's Corps. On 23 February the battery was at Murfreesboro in Brig. Gen. T.C. Hindman's Brigade.

== 1 June 1861 ==
Organized as Company #6, (or Company #7), Tennessee Artillery Corps, Provisional Army of Tennessee, Bowling Green, KY.
Commander: Captain William Miller

== 6 August 1861 ==
Organized and mustered into Confederate service in Memphis, designated as Company K, 1st Tennessee Heavy Artillery.
Commander: Captain William Miller (6 August 1861 - 13 May 1862 - Resigned)

== Assignments ==
- 1st Geographical Division, Department #2 (December 1861)
- Bowen's Brigade, Central Army of Kentucky, Department #2 (December 1861 – February 1862)
- Hindman's Brigade, Hardee's Corps, Central Army of Kentucky, Department #2 (February – March 1862)
- Shaver's Brigade, Hindman's Division, 3rd Corps, Army of the Mississippi, Department #2 (March – May 1862)

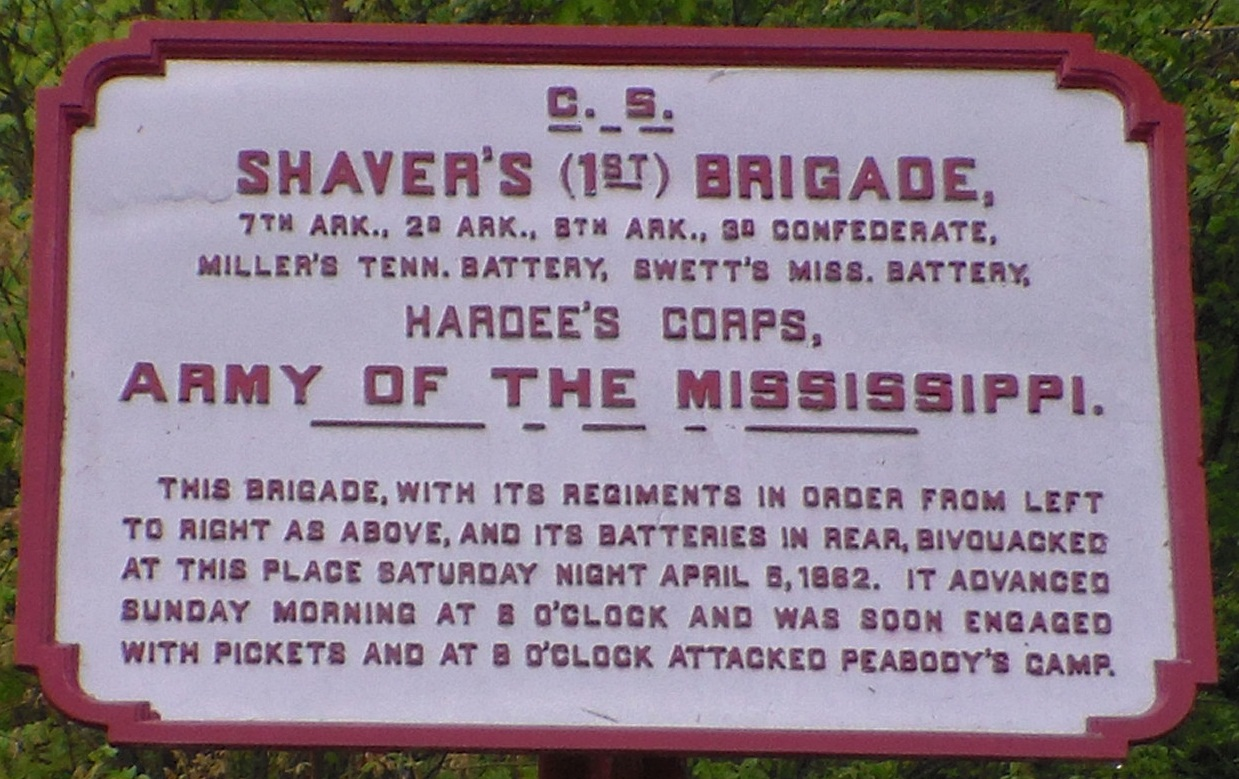
Battery marker near Shiloh Battlefield

== Known Battles ==
- Shiloh (Pittsburg Landing), Tennessee 6–7 April 1862
- Fielded 114 men, 2x6-pounder smooth-bores, 2x12-pounder Howitzers, and 2x3-inch Rifles.

== 10 May 1862 ==
Reorganized as Company K, 1st Tennessee Heavy Artillery, attached to the Army of the Mississippi.

Commander: Captain William L. Neyland (10 May 1862)
Other Officers:

- Lieutenant George W. Miller (10 May - 19 June 1862 - Transferred to 2nd Company D)
- Lieutenant Daniel Bogart (10 May - 19 June 1862 - Transferred to the A.C.S.)
- 2nd Lieutenant Henry Feister (10 May - 31 December 1862 - Transferred to 2nd Company B)

Another and different Co. "K" was later attached to the regiment at Vicksburg, Mississippi.

From "Shiloh, Shells and Artillery": "Previous Service: From Memphis, the Pillow Flying Artillery was sent to Belmont, Missouri, and then to Columbus, Kentucky. On December 30, 1861, the battery was transferred, with an aggregate of 70 men, from Columbus to Bowling Green, Kentucky, where it was attached to Bowen's Brigade, Floyd's Division, Hardee's Corps. The Battery accompanied Johnson's Army in its retreat to Corinth, MS, by way of Murfreesboro, Tennessee."

"Remarks: Although there are no records or official reports of the Pillow Flying Artillery, Colonel R. G. Shaver lists the battery as a part of his brigade, but it is not mentioned further. It can be assumed that the battery joined Shaver's Brigade in its attack upon Peabody's Camp, and probably fought with the brigade Sunday, April 6, 1862."

== See also ==
- List of Tennessee Confederate Civil War units
- Battle of Fort Pillow
