= James D. Tillman =

American politician

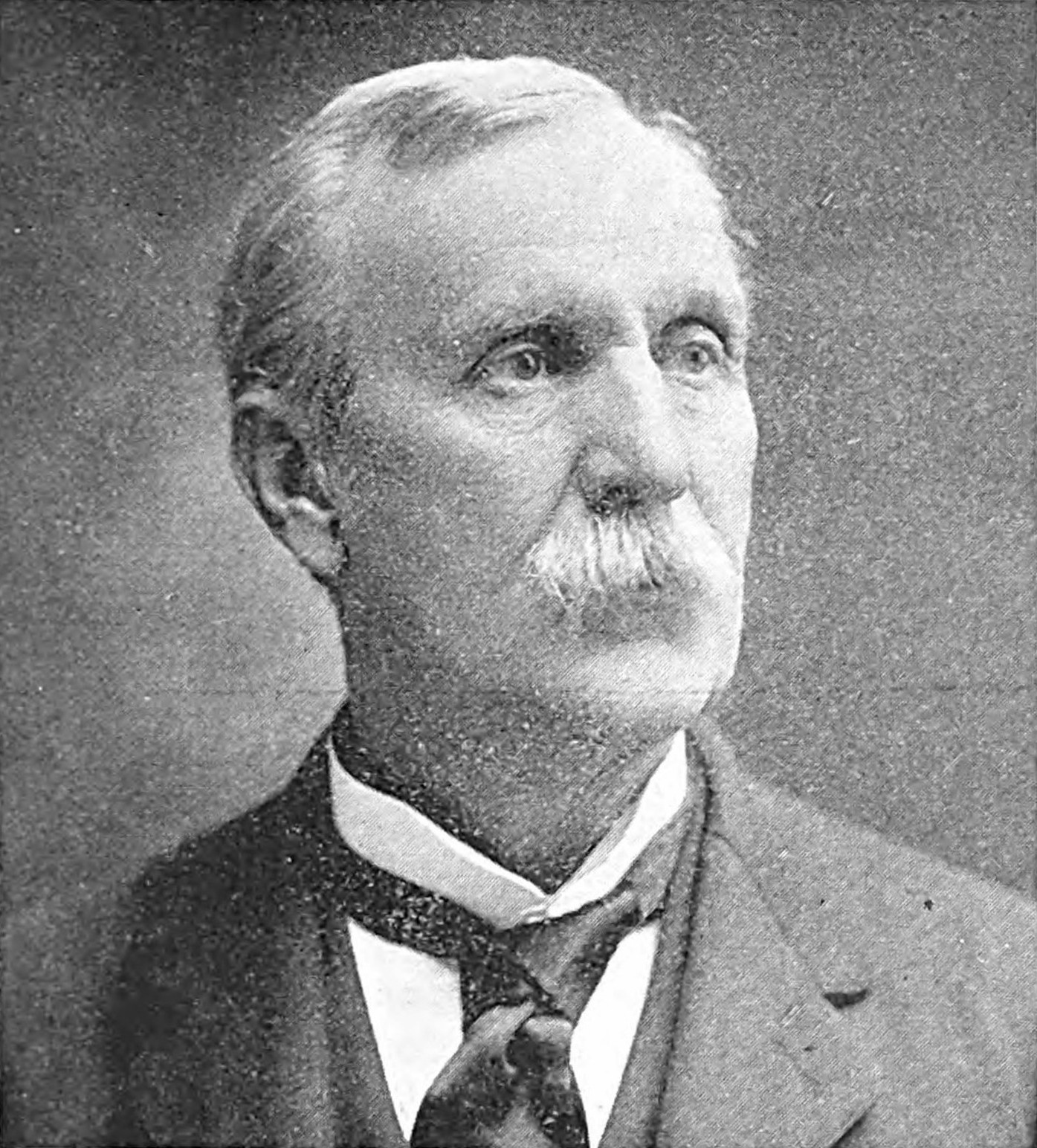
James D. Tillman in 1901

James Davidson Tillman (November 25, 1841 – June 16, 1916) was a colonel during the American Civil War, Tennessee State Senator and U.S. Minister to Ecuador.

== Early life ==
James Davidson Tillman, son of Lewis Tillman (1816–1886) and Mary Catherine Davidson Tillman (1823–1902) was born in Bedford County, Tennessee on November 25, 1841. Among his brothers was Samuel Escue Tillman, a West Point graduate and long time professor there, who served as Superintendent during World War I. He graduated from the University of Nashville and was studying for his law degree at Cumberland University on the eve of the Civil War.

== Career ==
During the American Civil War, Tillman served in the Confederate States Army as a colonel in the 41st Tennessee Regiment and later in the Tennessee Consolidated Regiment. After the war, he read law and was admitted to the bar in 1866. He practiced law briefly in Shelbyville, Tennessee before moving to Fayetteville, Tennessee.

Tillman served as a Democrat in the Tennessee House of Representatives from 1871 to 1873. He then served in the Tennessee State Senate from 1873 to 1875. Tillman was an unsuccessful candidate for the United States House of Representatives in 1882. He served a second term in the Tennessee Senate from 1893 to 1895 before being appointed by President Grover Cleveland as the U.S. Minister to Ecuador from 1895 to 1897. Tillman served a third term in the Tennessee Senate from 1901 to 1903 and a second term in the Tennessee House of Representatives from 1911 to 1913.

== Death ==
Tillman died in Fayetteville, Tennessee on June 16, 1916. He is interred at the Rose Hill Cemetery in Fayetteville.
