= 1st Tennessee Infantry Regiment =

Infantry regiment of the Confederate States Army

- Active: 1861–1865
- Disbanded: May 1, 1865
- Country: Confederate States
- Allegiance: Tennessee
- Branch: Army
- Type: Infantry
- Size: Regiment
- Part of: Maney's Brigade
- Nickname: "First Tennessee"
- Facings: Light blue
- Arms: Enfield rifled muskets; Whitworth rifles
- Battles: American Civil War; Battle of Cheat Mountain; Battle of Shiloh; Battle of Perryville; Battle of Stones River; Battle of Chickamauga; Battle of Chattanooga; Battle of Kennesaw Mountain; Battle of Franklin; Battle of Nashville; Battle of Bentonville

Commanders
- Commanding officers: Colonel George E. Maney; Colonel Hume R. Field

The 1st Tennessee Infantry Regiment, commonly known as the "First Tennessee", was a line infantry formation of the Confederate States Army in the Western Theater of the American Civil War. It was successively commanded by Colonels George E. Maney and Hume R. Field.

Organized in 1861 with volunteers from western Tennessee, the regiment was assigned to Maney's Brigade, Cheatham's Division, 1st Corps, Army of Tennessee. After sustaining heavy casualties at the battles of Shiloh and Perryville, it was amalgamated with the 27th Tennessee Infantry Regiment.

== History ==
The regiment was organized on May 9, 1861, and mustered into Confederate service on August 1st. George E. Maney, who commanded the Rock City Guards (which later became companies A, B and C), was elected colonel for the first 90 days. Early in the war the men of the three companies called themselves the "Orphan Boys." After that, command passed to Hume R. Field. Private Sam Davis joined the First Tennessee as a scout, but was later executed by Union forces as a spy despite wearing a Confederate uniform when captured.

== See also ==
- List of Tennessee Confederate Civil War units
- Samuel R. Watkins
