= Rock City Guards =

- Active: 1860–1865
- Country: Confederate States
- Allegiance: Tennessee
- Branch: Confederate States Army
- Type: Infantry
- Size: 327 troops (1860)
- Part of: 1st Tennessee Infantry Regiment
- Engagements: American Civil War

Commanders
- Commander: George Earl Maney

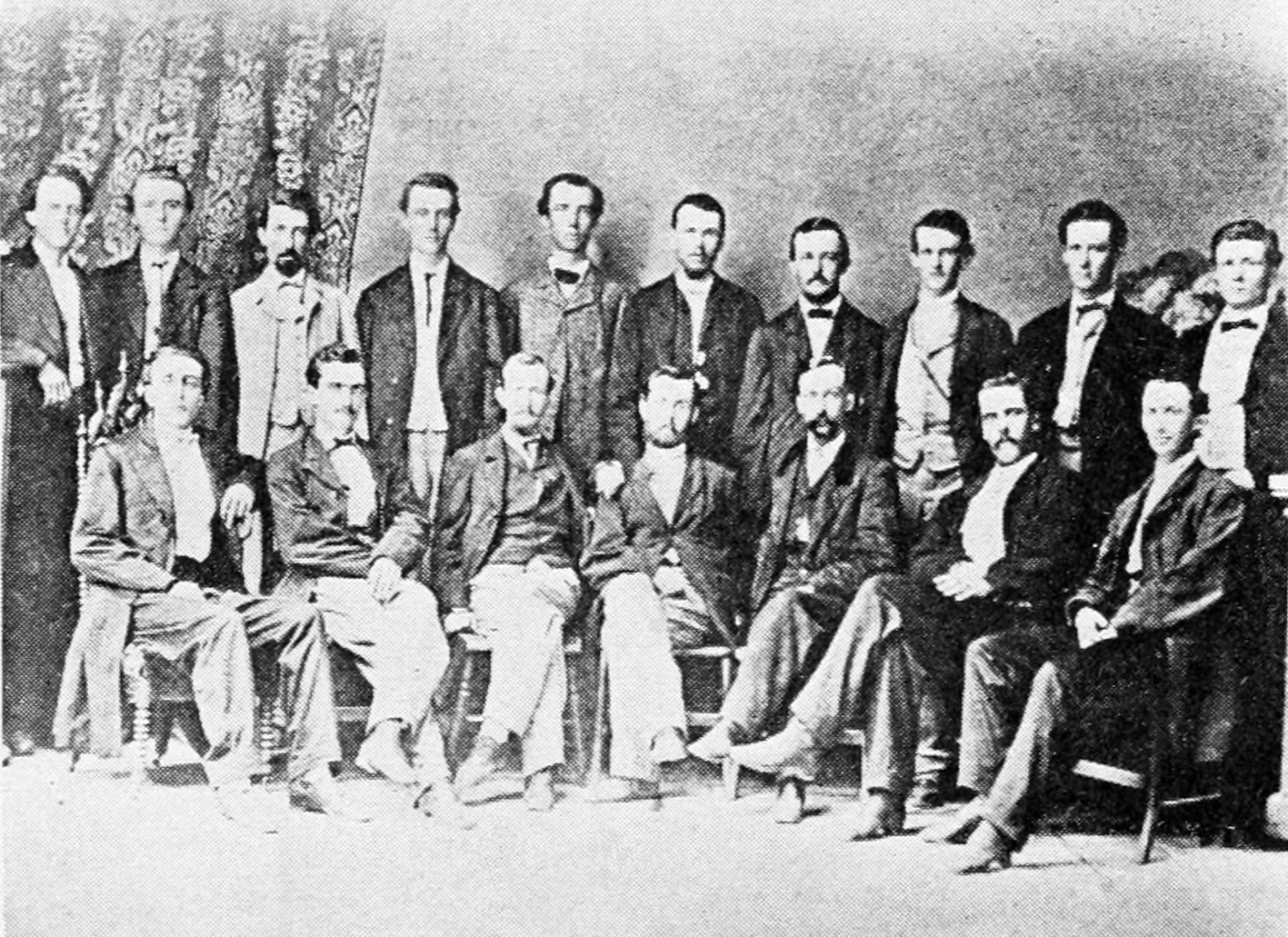
Survivors of the Rock City Guards after the war.

The Rock City Guards were a militia battalion raised in Nashville, Tennessee in 1860 in anticipation of the American Civil War. 327 men joined the organization; among them were George Maney, who served as captain; lawyer Thomas H. Malone, who served as lieutenant; and Charles Todd Quintard, who served as chaplain. In May 1861 the unit, now consisting of three companies, was mustered into Confederate service as part of the 1st Tennessee Infantry Regiment; George Maney becoming Colonel. The regiment served during the whole American Civil War.

A battle flag used by the Rock City Guards is at the Tennessee State Museum. Although newspaper accounts mention another flag used by the militia. In December of 1861, they carried a black flag though the streets of Nashville.

== See also ==
- 1st Tennessee Infantry Regiment
- List of Tennessee Confederate Civil War units
