= John M. Bright =

American politician (1817–1911)

John Morgan Bright
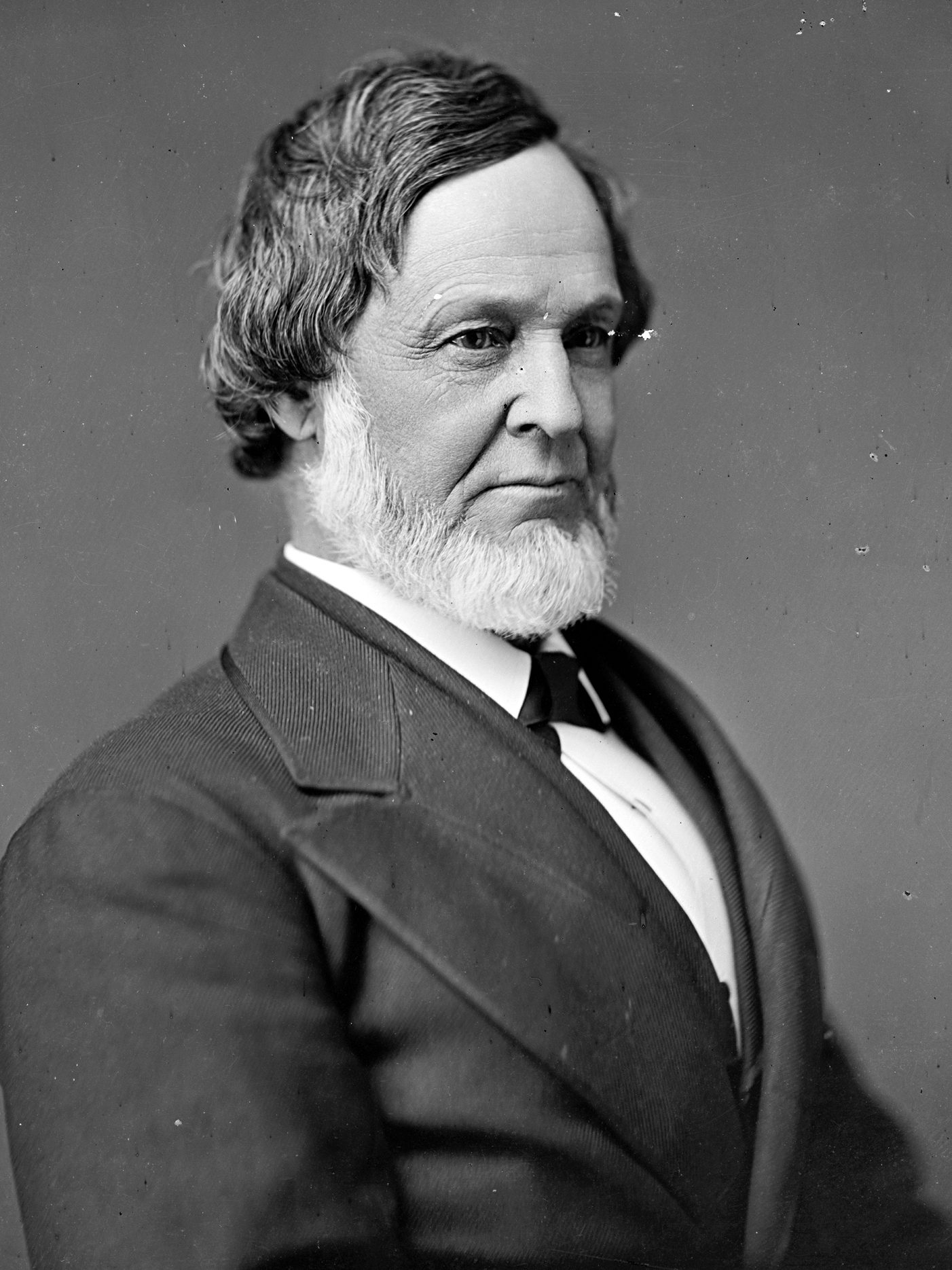

Member of the U.S. House of Representatives from Tennessee
- In office March 4, 1871 – March 3, 1881
- Preceded by: Lewis Tillman (4th); Horace Harrison (5th)
- Succeeded by: Samuel M. Fite (4th); Richard Warner (5th)
- Constituency: 4th district (1871-75); 5th district (1875-81)

Member of the Tennessee House of Representatives
- In office 1847-1848

Personal details
- Born: January 20, 1817 Fayetteville, Tennessee
- Died: October 3, 1911 (aged 94) Fayetteville, Tennessee
- Party: Democratic
- Spouses: Judith C. Clark Bright; Zerilda B Buckner Bright; Isabella Buckner Bright
- Children: James Clark Bright; Golding Bright; W. C. Bright; Robert Lucius Bright; John Morgan Bright; Anna Mary Bright; Susan Catherine Bright; Judith Margaret Bright; Becham Bright; Anthoney Buckner Bright; David Mitchel Bright; Mathew M Bright; Samuel Bright
- Education: Nashville University Transylvania University
- Profession: lawyer; politician

John Morgan Bright (January 20, 1817 – October 2, 1911) was an American politician who served as a U.S. Representative from Tennessee.

== Biography ==
Born in Fayetteville, Tennessee, Bright was the son of James and Nancy Morgan Bright. He attended the schools of Fayetteville and Bingham's School in Hillsboro, North Carolina. He graduated from Nashville University in September 1839. In March 1841 he graduated from the law department of Transylvania University, Lexington, Kentucky.

Bright first married Judith C. Clark and they had nine children, James Clark Bright, Golding Bright, W. C. Bright, Robert Lucius Bright, John Morgan Bright, Anna Mary Bright, Susan Catherine Bright, Judith Margaret Bright, and Samual A.Bright. He next married Zerilda B Buckner and they had four children, Anthoney Buckner Bright, David Mitchel Bright, Becham Bright and Mathew M Bright. His third marriage was to Isabella Buckner.

== Career ==
Upon being admitted to the bar in 1841, Bright began his law practice in Fayetteville. He also served as a member of the Tennessee House of Representatives in 1847 and 1848. While in the Legislature he introduced and passed the bill providing for the construction of Tenn., Asylum for the Insane.

During the Civil War, he was Inspector General of Tennessee, with the rank of Brigadier General, and served on the staff of Governor Isham G. Harris from 1861 to 1865.

Elected as a Democrat to the Forty-second for the fourth district of Tennessee, Bright was re-elected to the four succeeding Congresses. The re-districting for the 44th Congress changed his representation to the fifth district. He served from March 4, 1871, to March 3, 1881. His first speech in the U. S. House of Representatives was against the Ku-Klux Bill. He served as chairman of the Committee on Claims (Forty-fourth through Forty-sixth Congresses), Committee on Expenditures in the Department of the Treasury (Forty-fourth Congress). He was an unsuccessful candidate for reelection in 1880 to the Forty-seventh Congress.

After leaving politics, Bright resumed the practice of law in Fayetteville.

== Death ==
Bright died in Fayetteville on October 2, 1911, at the age of 94 years and 256 days. He is interred at the Presbyterian Churchyard, Fayetteville, Tennessee.

U.S. House of Representatives
Preceded by Lewis Tillman	Member of the U.S. House of Representatives from Tennessee's 4th congressional district March 4, 1871 - March 3, 1875	Succeeded by Samuel M. Fite
Preceded by Horace Harrison	Member of the U.S. House of Representatives from Tennessee's 5th congressional district March 4, 1875 - March 3, 1881	Succeeded by Richard Warner
