= George Earl Maney =

Confederate Army general

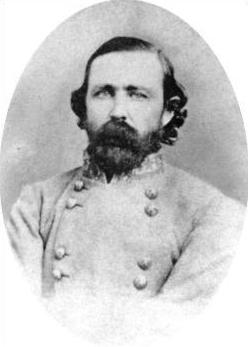
- Maney in uniform, ca. 1862

United States Minister to Paraguay and Uruguay
- In office May 19, 1890 – June 30, 1894
- President: Benjamin Harrison
- Preceded by: John E. Bacon
- Succeeded by: Granville Stuart

Member of the Tennessee Senate from Cheatham and Davidson Counties
- In office January 3, 1887 – 1888
- Preceded by: Thomas A. Kercheval
- Succeeded by: Thomas D. Craighead

United States Minister Resident to Bolivia
- In office November 4, 1882 – June 1, 1883
- President: Chester A. Arthur
- Preceded by: Charles Adams
- Succeeded by: Richard Gibbs

United States Minister Resident to Colombia
- In office September 21, 1881 – July 19, 1882
- President: Chester A. Arthur
- Preceded by: Ernest J. Dichman
- Succeeded by: William Lindsay Scruggs

Member of the Tennessee House of Representatives from Davidson County
- In office October 1, 1849 – October 6, 1851
- Preceded by: Joseph E. Manlove; John Bell
- Succeeded by: Russell Hinton; Joel A. Battle

Personal details
- Born: August 24, 1826 Franklin, Tennessee, U.S.
- Died: February 9, 1901 (aged 74) Washington, D.C., U.S.
- Resting place: Mount Olivet Cemetery, Nashville, Tennessee, U.S.
- Party: Republican
- Spouse: Elizabeth T. Crutcher
- Parent(s): Thomas Maney; Ann Rebecca Southall
- Education: University of Nashville

Military service
- Allegiance: United States; Confederate States
- Branch/service: United States Volunteers; Confederate States Army
- Years of service: 1846–1848 (USA); 1861–1865 (CSA)
- Rank: First Lieutenant (USA); Brigadier-General (CSA)
- Unit: 3rd U.S. Dragoons
- Commands: 1st Tennessee Infantry; Maney's Brigade; Cheatham's Division
- Battles/wars: Mexican-American War; American Civil War: Battle of Cheat Mountain; Kentucky Campaign; Battle of Stones River; Battle of Chickamauga; Chattanooga campaign; Atlanta campaign; Campaign of the Carolinas

Brigadier-General George Earl Maney (August 24, 1826 – February 9, 1901) was an American soldier, politician, railroad executive and diplomat. He was a general in the Confederate States Army during the American Civil War and a reconstruction era U.S. ambassador to Colombia, Bolivia, Uruguay, and Paraguay.

== Early life and education ==
George Earl Maney was born in Franklin, Tennessee, to Judge Thomas Maney and his wife. His father was a prominent newspaper editor and circuit judge. Young Maney attended the Nashville Seminary before graduating from the University of Nashville in 1845 at the age of 19.

== Mexican-American War ==
Maney served as a second lieutenant in the 1st Tennessee Volunteer Regiment during the Mexican-American War (1846–1848). When his three-months term of enlistment expired, he enrolled in the United States Army and served as a first lieutenant in the 3rd U.S. Dragoons, which participated in General Winfield Scott's march to Mexico City.

== Return to civilian life ==
When hostilities ceased, Maney returned home. He studied law, passed his bar exam in 1850, and established a law practice in Franklin. It became quite successful. Maney subsequently entered politics and was elected to the Tennessee State Legislature.

== American Civil War ==
Following the secession of Tennessee and the beginning of the American Civil War, Maney joined the Rock City Guards, a Nashville militia. He subsequently enlisted in the Confederate States Army as a captain in the 11th Tennessee Volunteer Infantry. On May 6, 1861, he was promoted to colonel of the 1st Tennessee. He served in western Virginia, first under Robert E. Lee at the Battle of Cheat Mountain and later under Thomas J. "Stonewall" Jackson at Bath and Romney.

Maney asked for a reassignment to his native Tennessee, which was threatened by Union forces. As an officer in the Army of Tennessee, Maney participated in the Battle of Shiloh and was promoted on April 16, 1862, to brigadier general. He led his brigade in the battles of Perryville, Chickamauga, and Murfreesboro. In November 1863, he was wounded severely in his arm during the Chattanooga Campaign. He was on medical leave for much of the rest of the year.

In 1864, Maney commanded a division in William J. Hardee's corps during the Atlanta campaign. He was captured in August and later released, but he did not return to active field duty because of problems with his wounded arm. Hardee recommended that Maney be promoted to major general, but the request was not fulfilled. Maney surrendered following the Carolinas campaign and was paroled on May 1, 1865, at Greensboro, North Carolina.

== Postwar career ==
After the war, Maney returned to his Tennessee home. He became president of the Tennessee and Pacific Railroad in 1868, serving in that executive post for nine years. Unlike many of his former Confederate compatriots, he became an active Republican. He was elected to the state senate. During the carpetbagger era, Maney held considerable influence over the Governor of Tennessee, Dewitt Clinton Senter. Maney helped restore the government to former Confederates once their civil rights were restored.

Maney became active in a number of reconciliation efforts during Reconstruction, working to improve relations between the former enemies. In early 1876, he was a candidate for governor, but withdrew his name from the ballot. In December of that year, his daughter Frances married a former Union officer in the 15th Massachusetts.

Maney in 1887

During the presidential administrations of James A. Garfield, Chester Arthur, and Benjamin Harrison, Maney was appointed as ambassador to various countries in South America. He was the U.S. minister to Colombia (1881–1882), and then was the Minister Resident/Consul General to Bolivia from November 4, 1882, until June 1, 1883. He returned home and was a delegate to the Republican National Conventions of 1884 and 1888. Maney also served as a Tennessee state senator from 1887 to 1888. He then spent four years (1890–1894) as the U.S. ambassador to Uruguay and Paraguay.

General George Maney died in Washington, D.C., from a cerebral hemorrhage. He is buried in Mount Olivet Cemetery in Nashville, Tennessee.

== Personal life ==
Maney married Elizabeth T. "Betty" Crutcher of Nashville in 1853; they raised a family of five children.

== See also ==
- List of American Civil War generals (Confederate)

== Notes ==
Party political offices
Preceded by Horace Maynard	Republican nominee for Governor of Tennessee; 1876	Succeeded by Eli M. Wight
Diplomatic posts
Preceded by Ernest Dichman	United States Minister Resident, Colombia; September 21, 1881 – July 19, 1882	Succeeded by William L. Scruggs
Preceded by Charles Adams	United States Minister Resident, Bolivia; November 4, 1882 – June 1, 1883	Succeeded by Richard Gibbs (diplomat)
Preceded by John E. Bacon	United States Minister Resident, Paraguay; May 19, 1890 – June 30, 1894	Succeeded by Granville Stuart
